

338001–338100 

|-bgcolor=#E9E9E9
| 338001 ||  || — || March 11, 2002 || Palomar || NEAT || — || align=right | 1.5 km || 
|-id=002 bgcolor=#fefefe
| 338002 ||  || — || March 12, 2002 || Palomar || NEAT || — || align=right | 1.9 km || 
|-id=003 bgcolor=#E9E9E9
| 338003 ||  || — || March 13, 2002 || Socorro || LINEAR || — || align=right | 1.8 km || 
|-id=004 bgcolor=#E9E9E9
| 338004 ||  || — || March 13, 2002 || Socorro || LINEAR || GER || align=right | 1.9 km || 
|-id=005 bgcolor=#E9E9E9
| 338005 ||  || — || March 13, 2002 || Palomar || NEAT || — || align=right | 2.1 km || 
|-id=006 bgcolor=#E9E9E9
| 338006 ||  || — || March 9, 2002 || Anderson Mesa || LONEOS || — || align=right | 3.0 km || 
|-id=007 bgcolor=#E9E9E9
| 338007 ||  || — || March 9, 2002 || Anderson Mesa || LONEOS || — || align=right | 2.3 km || 
|-id=008 bgcolor=#E9E9E9
| 338008 ||  || — || March 10, 2002 || Kitt Peak || Spacewatch || RAF || align=right | 1.3 km || 
|-id=009 bgcolor=#d6d6d6
| 338009 ||  || — || March 12, 2002 || Anderson Mesa || LONEOS || 7:4 || align=right | 3.4 km || 
|-id=010 bgcolor=#E9E9E9
| 338010 ||  || — || March 12, 2002 || Palomar || NEAT || — || align=right | 1.1 km || 
|-id=011 bgcolor=#E9E9E9
| 338011 ||  || — || March 12, 2002 || Palomar || NEAT || — || align=right | 1.8 km || 
|-id=012 bgcolor=#E9E9E9
| 338012 ||  || — || March 15, 2002 || Palomar || NEAT || — || align=right | 1.2 km || 
|-id=013 bgcolor=#fefefe
| 338013 ||  || — || March 6, 2002 || Palomar || NEAT || — || align=right data-sort-value="0.87" | 870 m || 
|-id=014 bgcolor=#E9E9E9
| 338014 ||  || — || March 14, 2002 || Palomar || NEAT || ADE || align=right | 1.8 km || 
|-id=015 bgcolor=#E9E9E9
| 338015 ||  || — || March 18, 2002 || Haleakala || NEAT || — || align=right | 1.6 km || 
|-id=016 bgcolor=#E9E9E9
| 338016 ||  || — || March 19, 2002 || Anderson Mesa || LONEOS || — || align=right | 1.1 km || 
|-id=017 bgcolor=#E9E9E9
| 338017 ||  || — || March 20, 2002 || Kitt Peak || Spacewatch || — || align=right | 2.3 km || 
|-id=018 bgcolor=#E9E9E9
| 338018 ||  || — || March 16, 2002 || Kitt Peak || Spacewatch || — || align=right | 1.4 km || 
|-id=019 bgcolor=#E9E9E9
| 338019 ||  || — || March 15, 2002 || Kvistaberg || UDAS || EUN || align=right | 1.7 km || 
|-id=020 bgcolor=#E9E9E9
| 338020 ||  || — || April 4, 2002 || Palomar || NEAT || — || align=right | 2.1 km || 
|-id=021 bgcolor=#E9E9E9
| 338021 ||  || — || April 8, 2002 || Palomar || NEAT || — || align=right | 1.8 km || 
|-id=022 bgcolor=#E9E9E9
| 338022 ||  || — || April 8, 2002 || Palomar || NEAT || — || align=right data-sort-value="0.92" | 920 m || 
|-id=023 bgcolor=#E9E9E9
| 338023 ||  || — || April 9, 2002 || Socorro || LINEAR || — || align=right | 1.4 km || 
|-id=024 bgcolor=#E9E9E9
| 338024 ||  || — || April 10, 2002 || Socorro || LINEAR || — || align=right | 1.2 km || 
|-id=025 bgcolor=#E9E9E9
| 338025 ||  || — || April 12, 2002 || Socorro || LINEAR || — || align=right | 2.3 km || 
|-id=026 bgcolor=#E9E9E9
| 338026 ||  || — || April 12, 2002 || Socorro || LINEAR || — || align=right | 1.6 km || 
|-id=027 bgcolor=#E9E9E9
| 338027 ||  || — || April 14, 2002 || Socorro || LINEAR || — || align=right | 1.4 km || 
|-id=028 bgcolor=#E9E9E9
| 338028 ||  || — || April 12, 2002 || Palomar || NEAT || POS || align=right | 3.3 km || 
|-id=029 bgcolor=#E9E9E9
| 338029 ||  || — || April 14, 2002 || Palomar || NEAT || EUN || align=right | 1.4 km || 
|-id=030 bgcolor=#E9E9E9
| 338030 ||  || — || April 10, 2002 || Socorro || LINEAR || EUN || align=right | 1.6 km || 
|-id=031 bgcolor=#E9E9E9
| 338031 ||  || — || April 10, 2002 || Palomar || NEAT || TIN || align=right | 1.8 km || 
|-id=032 bgcolor=#E9E9E9
| 338032 ||  || — || April 13, 2002 || Palomar || NEAT || — || align=right | 1.5 km || 
|-id=033 bgcolor=#E9E9E9
| 338033 ||  || — || April 18, 2002 || Kitt Peak || Spacewatch || — || align=right | 2.4 km || 
|-id=034 bgcolor=#E9E9E9
| 338034 ||  || — || May 9, 2002 || Socorro || LINEAR || — || align=right | 2.3 km || 
|-id=035 bgcolor=#E9E9E9
| 338035 ||  || — || May 9, 2002 || Socorro || LINEAR || JUN || align=right | 1.4 km || 
|-id=036 bgcolor=#E9E9E9
| 338036 ||  || — || May 9, 2002 || Socorro || LINEAR || EUN || align=right | 2.0 km || 
|-id=037 bgcolor=#E9E9E9
| 338037 ||  || — || May 7, 2002 || Socorro || LINEAR || JUN || align=right | 1.6 km || 
|-id=038 bgcolor=#E9E9E9
| 338038 ||  || — || May 11, 2002 || Socorro || LINEAR || — || align=right | 2.3 km || 
|-id=039 bgcolor=#E9E9E9
| 338039 ||  || — || May 11, 2002 || Socorro || LINEAR || — || align=right | 2.0 km || 
|-id=040 bgcolor=#E9E9E9
| 338040 ||  || — || May 11, 2002 || Socorro || LINEAR || — || align=right | 2.1 km || 
|-id=041 bgcolor=#E9E9E9
| 338041 ||  || — || May 7, 2002 || Palomar || NEAT || — || align=right | 1.8 km || 
|-id=042 bgcolor=#fefefe
| 338042 ||  || — || June 1, 2002 || Socorro || LINEAR || H || align=right data-sort-value="0.97" | 970 m || 
|-id=043 bgcolor=#E9E9E9
| 338043 ||  || — || March 17, 2002 || Kitt Peak || Spacewatch || GEF || align=right | 1.6 km || 
|-id=044 bgcolor=#E9E9E9
| 338044 ||  || — || June 5, 2002 || Socorro || LINEAR || — || align=right | 2.0 km || 
|-id=045 bgcolor=#fefefe
| 338045 ||  || — || June 12, 2002 || Palomar || NEAT || FLO || align=right data-sort-value="0.68" | 680 m || 
|-id=046 bgcolor=#E9E9E9
| 338046 ||  || — || June 12, 2002 || Palomar || NEAT || WIT || align=right | 1.4 km || 
|-id=047 bgcolor=#d6d6d6
| 338047 ||  || — || July 4, 2002 || Kitt Peak || Spacewatch || BRA || align=right | 1.4 km || 
|-id=048 bgcolor=#E9E9E9
| 338048 ||  || — || July 11, 2002 || Campo Imperatore || CINEOS || — || align=right | 2.1 km || 
|-id=049 bgcolor=#FFC2E0
| 338049 ||  || — || July 15, 2002 || Palomar || NEAT || APO +1km || align=right | 1.3 km || 
|-id=050 bgcolor=#E9E9E9
| 338050 ||  || — || July 5, 2002 || Socorro || LINEAR || INO || align=right | 1.7 km || 
|-id=051 bgcolor=#E9E9E9
| 338051 ||  || — || July 14, 2002 || Palomar || NEAT || — || align=right | 2.7 km || 
|-id=052 bgcolor=#E9E9E9
| 338052 ||  || — || July 14, 2002 || Palomar || NEAT || HOF || align=right | 2.7 km || 
|-id=053 bgcolor=#E9E9E9
| 338053 ||  || — || July 5, 2002 || Palomar || NEAT || — || align=right | 2.2 km || 
|-id=054 bgcolor=#E9E9E9
| 338054 ||  || — || January 17, 2005 || Kitt Peak || Spacewatch || HOF || align=right | 3.0 km || 
|-id=055 bgcolor=#E9E9E9
| 338055 ||  || — || April 2, 2006 || Kitt Peak || Spacewatch || — || align=right | 2.1 km || 
|-id=056 bgcolor=#E9E9E9
| 338056 ||  || — || October 27, 2003 || Kitt Peak || Spacewatch || — || align=right | 2.7 km || 
|-id=057 bgcolor=#FA8072
| 338057 ||  || — || June 13, 2005 || Mount Lemmon || Mount Lemmon Survey || — || align=right data-sort-value="0.91" | 910 m || 
|-id=058 bgcolor=#E9E9E9
| 338058 ||  || — || July 20, 2002 || Palomar || NEAT || — || align=right | 3.5 km || 
|-id=059 bgcolor=#E9E9E9
| 338059 ||  || — || February 2, 2005 || Kitt Peak || Spacewatch || HOF || align=right | 3.7 km || 
|-id=060 bgcolor=#E9E9E9
| 338060 ||  || — || July 29, 2002 || Palomar || S. F. Hönig || AGN || align=right | 1.3 km || 
|-id=061 bgcolor=#E9E9E9
| 338061 ||  || — || July 21, 2002 || Palomar || NEAT || — || align=right | 2.8 km || 
|-id=062 bgcolor=#fefefe
| 338062 ||  || — || July 21, 2002 || Palomar || NEAT || — || align=right data-sort-value="0.83" | 830 m || 
|-id=063 bgcolor=#E9E9E9
| 338063 ||  || — || July 18, 2002 || Palomar || NEAT || — || align=right | 2.2 km || 
|-id=064 bgcolor=#d6d6d6
| 338064 ||  || — || March 9, 2005 || Kitt Peak || Spacewatch || — || align=right | 2.9 km || 
|-id=065 bgcolor=#FA8072
| 338065 ||  || — || March 13, 2008 || Kitt Peak || Spacewatch || — || align=right data-sort-value="0.73" | 730 m || 
|-id=066 bgcolor=#E9E9E9
| 338066 ||  || — || August 5, 2002 || Palomar || NEAT || NEM || align=right | 2.8 km || 
|-id=067 bgcolor=#fefefe
| 338067 ||  || — || August 6, 2002 || Palomar || NEAT || — || align=right data-sort-value="0.67" | 670 m || 
|-id=068 bgcolor=#E9E9E9
| 338068 ||  || — || August 6, 2002 || Palomar || NEAT || — || align=right | 2.4 km || 
|-id=069 bgcolor=#E9E9E9
| 338069 ||  || — || August 6, 2002 || Palomar || NEAT || — || align=right | 2.6 km || 
|-id=070 bgcolor=#fefefe
| 338070 ||  || — || August 6, 2002 || Palomar || NEAT || — || align=right data-sort-value="0.75" | 750 m || 
|-id=071 bgcolor=#fefefe
| 338071 ||  || — || August 6, 2002 || Palomar || NEAT || FLO || align=right data-sort-value="0.67" | 670 m || 
|-id=072 bgcolor=#fefefe
| 338072 ||  || — || August 6, 2002 || Palomar || NEAT || — || align=right data-sort-value="0.68" | 680 m || 
|-id=073 bgcolor=#fefefe
| 338073 ||  || — || August 6, 2002 || Palomar || NEAT || — || align=right data-sort-value="0.62" | 620 m || 
|-id=074 bgcolor=#E9E9E9
| 338074 ||  || — || August 6, 2002 || Palomar || NEAT || AGN || align=right | 1.5 km || 
|-id=075 bgcolor=#fefefe
| 338075 ||  || — || August 9, 2002 || Socorro || LINEAR || — || align=right | 1.1 km || 
|-id=076 bgcolor=#fefefe
| 338076 ||  || — || August 8, 2002 || Palomar || NEAT || FLO || align=right data-sort-value="0.61" | 610 m || 
|-id=077 bgcolor=#d6d6d6
| 338077 ||  || — || August 10, 2002 || Socorro || LINEAR || YAK || align=right | 3.4 km || 
|-id=078 bgcolor=#fefefe
| 338078 ||  || — || August 12, 2002 || Socorro || LINEAR || — || align=right data-sort-value="0.75" | 750 m || 
|-id=079 bgcolor=#d6d6d6
| 338079 ||  || — || August 12, 2002 || Socorro || LINEAR || — || align=right | 2.7 km || 
|-id=080 bgcolor=#E9E9E9
| 338080 ||  || — || August 12, 2002 || Haleakala || NEAT || DOR || align=right | 3.0 km || 
|-id=081 bgcolor=#fefefe
| 338081 ||  || — || August 13, 2002 || Kitt Peak || Spacewatch || — || align=right data-sort-value="0.62" | 620 m || 
|-id=082 bgcolor=#fefefe
| 338082 ||  || — || August 13, 2002 || Anderson Mesa || LONEOS || — || align=right data-sort-value="0.86" | 860 m || 
|-id=083 bgcolor=#fefefe
| 338083 ||  || — || August 13, 2002 || Anderson Mesa || LONEOS || FLO || align=right data-sort-value="0.65" | 650 m || 
|-id=084 bgcolor=#FA8072
| 338084 ||  || — || August 14, 2002 || Socorro || LINEAR || — || align=right data-sort-value="0.83" | 830 m || 
|-id=085 bgcolor=#FA8072
| 338085 ||  || — || August 11, 2002 || Socorro || LINEAR || — || align=right | 1.1 km || 
|-id=086 bgcolor=#E9E9E9
| 338086 ||  || — || August 8, 2002 || Palomar || NEAT || — || align=right | 2.3 km || 
|-id=087 bgcolor=#E9E9E9
| 338087 ||  || — || August 8, 2002 || Palomar || NEAT || HOF || align=right | 2.8 km || 
|-id=088 bgcolor=#fefefe
| 338088 ||  || — || August 12, 2002 || Haleakala || NEAT || — || align=right data-sort-value="0.85" | 850 m || 
|-id=089 bgcolor=#E9E9E9
| 338089 ||  || — || August 7, 2002 || Palomar || NEAT || — || align=right | 2.5 km || 
|-id=090 bgcolor=#E9E9E9
| 338090 ||  || — || August 8, 2002 || Palomar || NEAT || — || align=right | 3.7 km || 
|-id=091 bgcolor=#E9E9E9
| 338091 ||  || — || August 15, 2002 || Palomar || NEAT || AGN || align=right | 1.4 km || 
|-id=092 bgcolor=#E9E9E9
| 338092 ||  || — || August 8, 2002 || Palomar || NEAT || GEF || align=right | 1.3 km || 
|-id=093 bgcolor=#fefefe
| 338093 ||  || — || August 13, 2002 || Anderson Mesa || LONEOS || — || align=right data-sort-value="0.72" | 720 m || 
|-id=094 bgcolor=#d6d6d6
| 338094 ||  || — || August 11, 2002 || Palomar || NEAT || BRA || align=right | 1.7 km || 
|-id=095 bgcolor=#fefefe
| 338095 ||  || — || August 11, 2002 || Palomar || NEAT || — || align=right data-sort-value="0.82" | 820 m || 
|-id=096 bgcolor=#E9E9E9
| 338096 ||  || — || August 11, 2002 || Palomar || NEAT || — || align=right | 2.5 km || 
|-id=097 bgcolor=#fefefe
| 338097 ||  || — || August 15, 2002 || Palomar || NEAT || — || align=right data-sort-value="0.86" | 860 m || 
|-id=098 bgcolor=#E9E9E9
| 338098 ||  || — || August 8, 2002 || Palomar || NEAT || WIT || align=right | 1.4 km || 
|-id=099 bgcolor=#fefefe
| 338099 ||  || — || August 8, 2002 || Palomar || NEAT || — || align=right data-sort-value="0.86" | 860 m || 
|-id=100 bgcolor=#d6d6d6
| 338100 ||  || — || September 10, 2007 || Mount Lemmon || Mount Lemmon Survey || — || align=right | 2.1 km || 
|}

338101–338200 

|-bgcolor=#FA8072
| 338101 ||  || — || April 11, 2008 || Mount Lemmon || Mount Lemmon Survey || — || align=right data-sort-value="0.90" | 900 m || 
|-id=102 bgcolor=#fefefe
| 338102 ||  || — || April 7, 2008 || Kitt Peak || Spacewatch || — || align=right data-sort-value="0.72" | 720 m || 
|-id=103 bgcolor=#E9E9E9
| 338103 ||  || — || October 25, 2003 || Kitt Peak || Spacewatch || WIT || align=right | 1.2 km || 
|-id=104 bgcolor=#E9E9E9
| 338104 ||  || — || November 20, 2003 || Kitt Peak || Spacewatch || — || align=right | 2.5 km || 
|-id=105 bgcolor=#E9E9E9
| 338105 ||  || — || April 23, 2001 || Socorro || LINEAR || — || align=right | 3.8 km || 
|-id=106 bgcolor=#E9E9E9
| 338106 ||  || — || August 16, 2002 || Palomar || NEAT || — || align=right | 3.5 km || 
|-id=107 bgcolor=#fefefe
| 338107 ||  || — || August 26, 2002 || Palomar || NEAT || FLO || align=right data-sort-value="0.70" | 700 m || 
|-id=108 bgcolor=#d6d6d6
| 338108 ||  || — || August 29, 2002 || Kitt Peak || Spacewatch || BRA || align=right | 1.4 km || 
|-id=109 bgcolor=#d6d6d6
| 338109 ||  || — || August 29, 2002 || Palomar || NEAT || CHA || align=right | 2.7 km || 
|-id=110 bgcolor=#d6d6d6
| 338110 ||  || — || August 30, 2002 || Palomar || NEAT || — || align=right | 3.4 km || 
|-id=111 bgcolor=#fefefe
| 338111 ||  || — || August 27, 2002 || Palomar || S. F. Hönig || FLO || align=right data-sort-value="0.52" | 520 m || 
|-id=112 bgcolor=#fefefe
| 338112 ||  || — || August 17, 2002 || Palomar || A. Lowe || — || align=right data-sort-value="0.90" | 900 m || 
|-id=113 bgcolor=#d6d6d6
| 338113 ||  || — || August 29, 2002 || Palomar || S. F. Hönig || — || align=right | 2.9 km || 
|-id=114 bgcolor=#fefefe
| 338114 ||  || — || August 29, 2002 || Palomar || S. F. Hönig || — || align=right data-sort-value="0.81" | 810 m || 
|-id=115 bgcolor=#fefefe
| 338115 ||  || — || August 17, 2002 || Palomar || A. Lowe || — || align=right data-sort-value="0.54" | 540 m || 
|-id=116 bgcolor=#d6d6d6
| 338116 ||  || — || August 28, 2002 || Palomar || NEAT || 615 || align=right | 1.9 km || 
|-id=117 bgcolor=#E9E9E9
| 338117 ||  || — || August 28, 2002 || Palomar || NEAT || — || align=right | 3.0 km || 
|-id=118 bgcolor=#fefefe
| 338118 ||  || — || August 28, 2002 || Palomar || NEAT || — || align=right data-sort-value="0.75" | 750 m || 
|-id=119 bgcolor=#d6d6d6
| 338119 ||  || — || August 18, 2002 || Palomar || NEAT || — || align=right | 2.3 km || 
|-id=120 bgcolor=#fefefe
| 338120 ||  || — || August 17, 2002 || Palomar || NEAT || — || align=right data-sort-value="0.53" | 530 m || 
|-id=121 bgcolor=#fefefe
| 338121 ||  || — || August 19, 2002 || Palomar || NEAT || — || align=right data-sort-value="0.72" | 720 m || 
|-id=122 bgcolor=#fefefe
| 338122 ||  || — || August 28, 2002 || Palomar || NEAT || FLO || align=right data-sort-value="0.61" | 610 m || 
|-id=123 bgcolor=#fefefe
| 338123 ||  || — || August 27, 2002 || Palomar || NEAT || — || align=right data-sort-value="0.78" | 780 m || 
|-id=124 bgcolor=#fefefe
| 338124 ||  || — || August 19, 2002 || Palomar || NEAT || — || align=right data-sort-value="0.74" | 740 m || 
|-id=125 bgcolor=#E9E9E9
| 338125 ||  || — || August 17, 2002 || Palomar || NEAT || HOF || align=right | 2.7 km || 
|-id=126 bgcolor=#fefefe
| 338126 ||  || — || August 19, 2002 || Palomar || NEAT || — || align=right data-sort-value="0.74" | 740 m || 
|-id=127 bgcolor=#fefefe
| 338127 ||  || — || August 27, 2002 || Palomar || NEAT || — || align=right data-sort-value="0.62" | 620 m || 
|-id=128 bgcolor=#fefefe
| 338128 ||  || — || August 12, 2002 || Haleakala || NEAT || — || align=right data-sort-value="0.73" | 730 m || 
|-id=129 bgcolor=#d6d6d6
| 338129 ||  || — || August 19, 2002 || Palomar || NEAT || CHA || align=right | 2.5 km || 
|-id=130 bgcolor=#d6d6d6
| 338130 ||  || — || August 28, 2002 || Palomar || NEAT || — || align=right | 3.4 km || 
|-id=131 bgcolor=#d6d6d6
| 338131 ||  || — || August 30, 2002 || Palomar || NEAT || BRA || align=right | 1.4 km || 
|-id=132 bgcolor=#d6d6d6
| 338132 ||  || — || August 18, 2002 || Palomar || NEAT || 628 || align=right | 1.9 km || 
|-id=133 bgcolor=#fefefe
| 338133 ||  || — || August 18, 2002 || Palomar || NEAT || — || align=right data-sort-value="0.65" | 650 m || 
|-id=134 bgcolor=#E9E9E9
| 338134 ||  || — || August 18, 2002 || Palomar || NEAT || — || align=right | 2.3 km || 
|-id=135 bgcolor=#d6d6d6
| 338135 ||  || — || August 19, 2002 || Palomar || NEAT || — || align=right | 3.5 km || 
|-id=136 bgcolor=#E9E9E9
| 338136 ||  || — || August 30, 2002 || Palomar || NEAT || HOF || align=right | 2.9 km || 
|-id=137 bgcolor=#E9E9E9
| 338137 ||  || — || August 27, 2002 || Palomar || NEAT || AGN || align=right | 1.3 km || 
|-id=138 bgcolor=#fefefe
| 338138 ||  || — || August 17, 2002 || Palomar || NEAT || — || align=right data-sort-value="0.70" | 700 m || 
|-id=139 bgcolor=#d6d6d6
| 338139 ||  || — || August 17, 2002 || Palomar || NEAT || — || align=right | 2.0 km || 
|-id=140 bgcolor=#E9E9E9
| 338140 ||  || — || August 27, 2002 || Palomar || NEAT || AGN || align=right | 1.3 km || 
|-id=141 bgcolor=#fefefe
| 338141 ||  || — || August 19, 2002 || Palomar || NEAT || — || align=right data-sort-value="0.89" | 890 m || 
|-id=142 bgcolor=#fefefe
| 338142 ||  || — || August 18, 2002 || Palomar || NEAT || FLO || align=right data-sort-value="0.64" | 640 m || 
|-id=143 bgcolor=#fefefe
| 338143 ||  || — || August 18, 2002 || Palomar || NEAT || — || align=right data-sort-value="0.86" | 860 m || 
|-id=144 bgcolor=#E9E9E9
| 338144 ||  || — || August 26, 2002 || Palomar || NEAT || — || align=right | 2.8 km || 
|-id=145 bgcolor=#E9E9E9
| 338145 ||  || — || August 30, 2002 || Palomar || NEAT || HOF || align=right | 3.1 km || 
|-id=146 bgcolor=#fefefe
| 338146 ||  || — || August 17, 2002 || Palomar || NEAT || — || align=right data-sort-value="0.68" | 680 m || 
|-id=147 bgcolor=#fefefe
| 338147 ||  || — || August 29, 2002 || Palomar || NEAT || — || align=right data-sort-value="0.63" | 630 m || 
|-id=148 bgcolor=#d6d6d6
| 338148 ||  || — || August 29, 2002 || Palomar || NEAT || — || align=right | 2.0 km || 
|-id=149 bgcolor=#d6d6d6
| 338149 ||  || — || August 29, 2002 || Palomar || NEAT || K-2 || align=right | 1.7 km || 
|-id=150 bgcolor=#E9E9E9
| 338150 ||  || — || December 31, 2008 || Kitt Peak || Spacewatch || WIT || align=right | 1.1 km || 
|-id=151 bgcolor=#fefefe
| 338151 ||  || — || August 30, 2002 || Palomar || NEAT || — || align=right data-sort-value="0.57" | 570 m || 
|-id=152 bgcolor=#d6d6d6
| 338152 ||  || — || August 27, 2002 || Palomar || NEAT || 615 || align=right | 1.5 km || 
|-id=153 bgcolor=#E9E9E9
| 338153 ||  || — || August 26, 2002 || Palomar || NEAT || HOF || align=right | 2.7 km || 
|-id=154 bgcolor=#d6d6d6
| 338154 ||  || — || September 12, 2007 || Dauban || Chante-Perdrix Obs. || — || align=right | 2.2 km || 
|-id=155 bgcolor=#d6d6d6
| 338155 ||  || — || September 12, 2007 || Mount Lemmon || Mount Lemmon Survey || KOR || align=right | 1.6 km || 
|-id=156 bgcolor=#d6d6d6
| 338156 ||  || — || April 30, 2006 || Kitt Peak || Spacewatch || — || align=right | 2.2 km || 
|-id=157 bgcolor=#E9E9E9
| 338157 ||  || — || October 6, 2007 || Socorro || LINEAR || AGN || align=right | 1.5 km || 
|-id=158 bgcolor=#fefefe
| 338158 ||  || — || November 28, 2006 || Mount Lemmon || Mount Lemmon Survey || — || align=right data-sort-value="0.85" | 850 m || 
|-id=159 bgcolor=#FA8072
| 338159 ||  || — || September 3, 2002 || Palomar || NEAT || — || align=right data-sort-value="0.82" | 820 m || 
|-id=160 bgcolor=#fefefe
| 338160 ||  || — || September 4, 2002 || Anderson Mesa || LONEOS || FLO || align=right data-sort-value="0.97" | 970 m || 
|-id=161 bgcolor=#fefefe
| 338161 ||  || — || September 1, 2002 || Haleakala || NEAT || — || align=right data-sort-value="0.81" | 810 m || 
|-id=162 bgcolor=#fefefe
| 338162 ||  || — || September 4, 2002 || Anderson Mesa || LONEOS || FLO || align=right data-sort-value="0.69" | 690 m || 
|-id=163 bgcolor=#fefefe
| 338163 ||  || — || September 4, 2002 || Anderson Mesa || LONEOS || — || align=right data-sort-value="0.86" | 860 m || 
|-id=164 bgcolor=#d6d6d6
| 338164 ||  || — || September 5, 2002 || Anderson Mesa || LONEOS || TRP || align=right | 3.4 km || 
|-id=165 bgcolor=#d6d6d6
| 338165 ||  || — || September 3, 2002 || Palomar || NEAT || — || align=right | 3.1 km || 
|-id=166 bgcolor=#fefefe
| 338166 ||  || — || September 3, 2002 || Palomar || NEAT || — || align=right | 1.5 km || 
|-id=167 bgcolor=#fefefe
| 338167 ||  || — || September 4, 2002 || Anderson Mesa || LONEOS || — || align=right data-sort-value="0.78" | 780 m || 
|-id=168 bgcolor=#fefefe
| 338168 ||  || — || September 5, 2002 || Socorro || LINEAR || — || align=right data-sort-value="0.82" | 820 m || 
|-id=169 bgcolor=#fefefe
| 338169 ||  || — || August 30, 2002 || Anderson Mesa || LONEOS || FLO || align=right data-sort-value="0.73" | 730 m || 
|-id=170 bgcolor=#fefefe
| 338170 ||  || — || September 5, 2002 || Socorro || LINEAR || — || align=right data-sort-value="0.98" | 980 m || 
|-id=171 bgcolor=#fefefe
| 338171 ||  || — || September 6, 2002 || Socorro || LINEAR || FLO || align=right | 1.00 km || 
|-id=172 bgcolor=#FFC2E0
| 338172 ||  || — || September 7, 2002 || Socorro || LINEAR || AMO +1km || align=right | 1.2 km || 
|-id=173 bgcolor=#d6d6d6
| 338173 ||  || — || September 6, 2002 || Socorro || LINEAR || — || align=right | 2.4 km || 
|-id=174 bgcolor=#d6d6d6
| 338174 ||  || — || September 6, 2002 || Socorro || LINEAR || CHA || align=right | 3.1 km || 
|-id=175 bgcolor=#fefefe
| 338175 ||  || — || August 20, 2002 || Palomar || NEAT || — || align=right data-sort-value="0.86" | 860 m || 
|-id=176 bgcolor=#FFC2E0
| 338176 ||  || — || September 6, 2002 || Socorro || LINEAR || AMO +1km || align=right | 1.6 km || 
|-id=177 bgcolor=#fefefe
| 338177 ||  || — || September 6, 2002 || Socorro || LINEAR || FLO || align=right data-sort-value="0.60" | 600 m || 
|-id=178 bgcolor=#fefefe
| 338178 ||  || — || September 8, 2002 || Campo Imperatore || CINEOS || — || align=right data-sort-value="0.90" | 900 m || 
|-id=179 bgcolor=#fefefe
| 338179 ||  || — || September 11, 2002 || Haleakala || NEAT || — || align=right data-sort-value="0.94" | 940 m || 
|-id=180 bgcolor=#fefefe
| 338180 ||  || — || September 9, 2002 || Haleakala || NEAT || FLO || align=right data-sort-value="0.73" | 730 m || 
|-id=181 bgcolor=#fefefe
| 338181 ||  || — || September 11, 2002 || Palomar || NEAT || — || align=right data-sort-value="0.65" | 650 m || 
|-id=182 bgcolor=#d6d6d6
| 338182 ||  || — || September 12, 2002 || Palomar || NEAT || — || align=right | 4.0 km || 
|-id=183 bgcolor=#d6d6d6
| 338183 ||  || — || September 13, 2002 || Palomar || NEAT || BRA || align=right | 1.6 km || 
|-id=184 bgcolor=#fefefe
| 338184 ||  || — || September 13, 2002 || Socorro || LINEAR || — || align=right data-sort-value="0.90" | 900 m || 
|-id=185 bgcolor=#d6d6d6
| 338185 ||  || — || September 11, 2002 || Palomar || NEAT || ITH || align=right | 2.0 km || 
|-id=186 bgcolor=#d6d6d6
| 338186 ||  || — || September 11, 2002 || Palomar || NEAT || — || align=right | 3.5 km || 
|-id=187 bgcolor=#fefefe
| 338187 ||  || — || September 13, 2002 || Palomar || NEAT || FLO || align=right data-sort-value="0.58" | 580 m || 
|-id=188 bgcolor=#fefefe
| 338188 ||  || — || September 1, 2002 || Palomar || NEAT || — || align=right data-sort-value="0.77" | 770 m || 
|-id=189 bgcolor=#fefefe
| 338189 ||  || — || September 13, 2002 || Palomar || NEAT || FLO || align=right data-sort-value="0.58" | 580 m || 
|-id=190 bgcolor=#d6d6d6
| 338190 ||  || — || September 15, 2002 || Kitt Peak || Spacewatch || — || align=right | 2.4 km || 
|-id=191 bgcolor=#E9E9E9
| 338191 ||  || — || September 14, 2002 || Palomar || R. Matson || — || align=right | 2.6 km || 
|-id=192 bgcolor=#fefefe
| 338192 ||  || — || September 4, 2002 || Palomar || NEAT || — || align=right data-sort-value="0.67" | 670 m || 
|-id=193 bgcolor=#d6d6d6
| 338193 ||  || — || September 4, 2002 || Palomar || NEAT || KOR || align=right | 1.3 km || 
|-id=194 bgcolor=#d6d6d6
| 338194 ||  || — || September 11, 2002 || Palomar || NEAT || — || align=right | 2.1 km || 
|-id=195 bgcolor=#fefefe
| 338195 ||  || — || September 12, 2002 || Palomar || NEAT || FLO || align=right data-sort-value="0.53" | 530 m || 
|-id=196 bgcolor=#d6d6d6
| 338196 ||  || — || September 4, 2002 || Palomar || NEAT || NAE || align=right | 2.1 km || 
|-id=197 bgcolor=#E9E9E9
| 338197 ||  || — || September 4, 2002 || Palomar || NEAT || AGN || align=right | 1.3 km || 
|-id=198 bgcolor=#fefefe
| 338198 ||  || — || September 15, 2002 || Palomar || NEAT || — || align=right data-sort-value="0.53" | 530 m || 
|-id=199 bgcolor=#d6d6d6
| 338199 ||  || — || September 14, 2002 || Palomar || NEAT || KOR || align=right | 1.3 km || 
|-id=200 bgcolor=#d6d6d6
| 338200 ||  || — || September 15, 2002 || Palomar || NEAT || KOR || align=right | 2.0 km || 
|}

338201–338300 

|-bgcolor=#d6d6d6
| 338201 ||  || — || September 12, 2002 || Palomar || NEAT || BRA || align=right | 1.7 km || 
|-id=202 bgcolor=#E9E9E9
| 338202 ||  || — || October 19, 2007 || Catalina || CSS || — || align=right | 2.9 km || 
|-id=203 bgcolor=#d6d6d6
| 338203 ||  || — || September 4, 2007 || Catalina || CSS || — || align=right | 2.9 km || 
|-id=204 bgcolor=#d6d6d6
| 338204 || 2002 SS || — || September 23, 2002 || Powell || Powell Obs. || — || align=right | 3.1 km || 
|-id=205 bgcolor=#fefefe
| 338205 ||  || — || September 27, 2002 || Palomar || NEAT || H || align=right data-sort-value="0.99" | 990 m || 
|-id=206 bgcolor=#fefefe
| 338206 ||  || — || September 27, 2002 || Palomar || NEAT || — || align=right data-sort-value="0.75" | 750 m || 
|-id=207 bgcolor=#fefefe
| 338207 ||  || — || September 28, 2002 || Palomar || NEAT || — || align=right data-sort-value="0.71" | 710 m || 
|-id=208 bgcolor=#fefefe
| 338208 ||  || — || September 28, 2002 || Palomar || NEAT || FLO || align=right data-sort-value="0.69" | 690 m || 
|-id=209 bgcolor=#fefefe
| 338209 ||  || — || September 28, 2002 || Haleakala || NEAT || — || align=right | 1.00 km || 
|-id=210 bgcolor=#fefefe
| 338210 ||  || — || September 29, 2002 || Haleakala || NEAT || — || align=right | 2.0 km || 
|-id=211 bgcolor=#d6d6d6
| 338211 ||  || — || September 29, 2002 || Haleakala || NEAT || 629 || align=right | 1.8 km || 
|-id=212 bgcolor=#fefefe
| 338212 ||  || — || September 29, 2002 || Haleakala || NEAT || FLO || align=right data-sort-value="0.87" | 870 m || 
|-id=213 bgcolor=#fefefe
| 338213 ||  || — || September 5, 2002 || Socorro || LINEAR || — || align=right | 1.2 km || 
|-id=214 bgcolor=#FA8072
| 338214 ||  || — || August 11, 2002 || Haleakala || NEAT || — || align=right | 1.0 km || 
|-id=215 bgcolor=#fefefe
| 338215 ||  || — || September 16, 2002 || Palomar || NEAT || FLO || align=right data-sort-value="0.68" | 680 m || 
|-id=216 bgcolor=#d6d6d6
| 338216 ||  || — || September 26, 2002 || Palomar || NEAT || CHA || align=right | 2.1 km || 
|-id=217 bgcolor=#fefefe
| 338217 ||  || — || October 1, 2002 || Anderson Mesa || LONEOS || — || align=right | 1.2 km || 
|-id=218 bgcolor=#fefefe
| 338218 ||  || — || October 1, 2002 || Haleakala || NEAT || — || align=right | 1.0 km || 
|-id=219 bgcolor=#fefefe
| 338219 ||  || — || October 1, 2002 || Anderson Mesa || LONEOS || FLO || align=right data-sort-value="0.68" | 680 m || 
|-id=220 bgcolor=#d6d6d6
| 338220 ||  || — || October 1, 2002 || Anderson Mesa || LONEOS || BRA || align=right | 2.0 km || 
|-id=221 bgcolor=#fefefe
| 338221 ||  || — || October 1, 2002 || Anderson Mesa || LONEOS || — || align=right data-sort-value="0.75" | 750 m || 
|-id=222 bgcolor=#fefefe
| 338222 ||  || — || October 2, 2002 || Socorro || LINEAR || — || align=right data-sort-value="0.90" | 900 m || 
|-id=223 bgcolor=#d6d6d6
| 338223 ||  || — || October 2, 2002 || Socorro || LINEAR || — || align=right | 2.6 km || 
|-id=224 bgcolor=#fefefe
| 338224 ||  || — || October 2, 2002 || Socorro || LINEAR || FLO || align=right data-sort-value="0.80" | 800 m || 
|-id=225 bgcolor=#fefefe
| 338225 ||  || — || October 2, 2002 || Socorro || LINEAR || — || align=right data-sort-value="0.86" | 860 m || 
|-id=226 bgcolor=#fefefe
| 338226 ||  || — || October 1, 2002 || Anderson Mesa || LONEOS || H || align=right data-sort-value="0.76" | 760 m || 
|-id=227 bgcolor=#d6d6d6
| 338227 ||  || — || October 3, 2002 || Campo Imperatore || CINEOS || — || align=right | 3.1 km || 
|-id=228 bgcolor=#fefefe
| 338228 ||  || — || October 3, 2002 || Socorro || LINEAR || — || align=right data-sort-value="0.77" | 770 m || 
|-id=229 bgcolor=#fefefe
| 338229 ||  || — || October 3, 2002 || Socorro || LINEAR || H || align=right data-sort-value="0.62" | 620 m || 
|-id=230 bgcolor=#fefefe
| 338230 ||  || — || October 3, 2002 || Palomar || NEAT || — || align=right | 1.2 km || 
|-id=231 bgcolor=#fefefe
| 338231 ||  || — || October 3, 2002 || Palomar || NEAT || — || align=right | 1.1 km || 
|-id=232 bgcolor=#fefefe
| 338232 ||  || — || October 1, 2002 || Anderson Mesa || LONEOS || — || align=right | 1.2 km || 
|-id=233 bgcolor=#fefefe
| 338233 ||  || — || October 1, 2002 || Anderson Mesa || LONEOS || — || align=right data-sort-value="0.82" | 820 m || 
|-id=234 bgcolor=#d6d6d6
| 338234 ||  || — || October 1, 2002 || Anderson Mesa || LONEOS || — || align=right | 3.1 km || 
|-id=235 bgcolor=#fefefe
| 338235 ||  || — || October 2, 2002 || Campo Imperatore || CINEOS || FLO || align=right data-sort-value="0.74" | 740 m || 
|-id=236 bgcolor=#fefefe
| 338236 ||  || — || October 3, 2002 || Palomar || NEAT || FLO || align=right data-sort-value="0.75" | 750 m || 
|-id=237 bgcolor=#d6d6d6
| 338237 ||  || — || October 3, 2002 || Socorro || LINEAR || — || align=right | 3.1 km || 
|-id=238 bgcolor=#FA8072
| 338238 ||  || — || October 4, 2002 || Anderson Mesa || LONEOS || — || align=right data-sort-value="0.75" | 750 m || 
|-id=239 bgcolor=#d6d6d6
| 338239 ||  || — || October 4, 2002 || Palomar || NEAT || CHA || align=right | 2.3 km || 
|-id=240 bgcolor=#d6d6d6
| 338240 ||  || — || October 2, 2002 || Haleakala || NEAT || — || align=right | 4.1 km || 
|-id=241 bgcolor=#d6d6d6
| 338241 ||  || — || October 3, 2002 || Palomar || NEAT || — || align=right | 3.3 km || 
|-id=242 bgcolor=#fefefe
| 338242 ||  || — || October 4, 2002 || Socorro || LINEAR || — || align=right | 1.0 km || 
|-id=243 bgcolor=#d6d6d6
| 338243 ||  || — || October 4, 2002 || Palomar || NEAT || — || align=right | 3.8 km || 
|-id=244 bgcolor=#fefefe
| 338244 ||  || — || October 5, 2002 || Palomar || NEAT || — || align=right data-sort-value="0.93" | 930 m || 
|-id=245 bgcolor=#fefefe
| 338245 ||  || — || October 5, 2002 || Palomar || NEAT || — || align=right | 1.0 km || 
|-id=246 bgcolor=#d6d6d6
| 338246 ||  || — || October 5, 2002 || Palomar || NEAT || — || align=right | 4.6 km || 
|-id=247 bgcolor=#d6d6d6
| 338247 ||  || — || October 4, 2002 || Anderson Mesa || LONEOS || — || align=right | 4.7 km || 
|-id=248 bgcolor=#fefefe
| 338248 ||  || — || October 12, 2002 || Socorro || LINEAR || — || align=right | 1.1 km || 
|-id=249 bgcolor=#d6d6d6
| 338249 ||  || — || October 4, 2002 || Socorro || LINEAR || — || align=right | 2.6 km || 
|-id=250 bgcolor=#fefefe
| 338250 ||  || — || October 4, 2002 || Socorro || LINEAR || — || align=right | 1.1 km || 
|-id=251 bgcolor=#fefefe
| 338251 ||  || — || October 4, 2002 || Socorro || LINEAR || FLO || align=right data-sort-value="0.67" | 670 m || 
|-id=252 bgcolor=#d6d6d6
| 338252 ||  || — || October 3, 2002 || Socorro || LINEAR || JLI || align=right | 5.8 km || 
|-id=253 bgcolor=#d6d6d6
| 338253 ||  || — || October 5, 2002 || Socorro || LINEAR || — || align=right | 3.3 km || 
|-id=254 bgcolor=#FA8072
| 338254 ||  || — || October 4, 2002 || Socorro || LINEAR || — || align=right | 1.0 km || 
|-id=255 bgcolor=#fefefe
| 338255 ||  || — || October 7, 2002 || Socorro || LINEAR || FLO || align=right data-sort-value="0.64" | 640 m || 
|-id=256 bgcolor=#fefefe
| 338256 ||  || — || October 2, 2002 || Haleakala || NEAT || FLO || align=right data-sort-value="0.77" | 770 m || 
|-id=257 bgcolor=#fefefe
| 338257 ||  || — || October 9, 2002 || Socorro || LINEAR || — || align=right data-sort-value="0.98" | 980 m || 
|-id=258 bgcolor=#d6d6d6
| 338258 ||  || — || October 6, 2002 || Socorro || LINEAR || — || align=right | 3.2 km || 
|-id=259 bgcolor=#E9E9E9
| 338259 ||  || — || October 6, 2002 || Socorro || LINEAR || — || align=right | 3.7 km || 
|-id=260 bgcolor=#d6d6d6
| 338260 ||  || — || October 8, 2002 || Anderson Mesa || LONEOS || — || align=right | 3.4 km || 
|-id=261 bgcolor=#d6d6d6
| 338261 ||  || — || October 7, 2002 || Haleakala || NEAT || EOS || align=right | 2.6 km || 
|-id=262 bgcolor=#fefefe
| 338262 ||  || — || October 8, 2002 || Anderson Mesa || LONEOS || — || align=right data-sort-value="0.98" | 980 m || 
|-id=263 bgcolor=#FA8072
| 338263 ||  || — || October 8, 2002 || Anderson Mesa || LONEOS || H || align=right data-sort-value="0.78" | 780 m || 
|-id=264 bgcolor=#d6d6d6
| 338264 ||  || — || October 8, 2002 || Anderson Mesa || LONEOS || — || align=right | 2.1 km || 
|-id=265 bgcolor=#d6d6d6
| 338265 ||  || — || October 10, 2002 || Socorro || LINEAR || Tj (2.95) || align=right | 4.4 km || 
|-id=266 bgcolor=#fefefe
| 338266 ||  || — || October 9, 2002 || Socorro || LINEAR || — || align=right data-sort-value="0.78" | 780 m || 
|-id=267 bgcolor=#fefefe
| 338267 ||  || — || October 9, 2002 || Socorro || LINEAR || — || align=right data-sort-value="0.83" | 830 m || 
|-id=268 bgcolor=#fefefe
| 338268 ||  || — || October 9, 2002 || Socorro || LINEAR || — || align=right data-sort-value="0.82" | 820 m || 
|-id=269 bgcolor=#fefefe
| 338269 ||  || — || October 10, 2002 || Socorro || LINEAR || — || align=right data-sort-value="0.78" | 780 m || 
|-id=270 bgcolor=#fefefe
| 338270 ||  || — || October 11, 2002 || Socorro || LINEAR || — || align=right data-sort-value="0.94" | 940 m || 
|-id=271 bgcolor=#d6d6d6
| 338271 ||  || — || October 12, 2002 || Socorro || LINEAR || — || align=right | 3.6 km || 
|-id=272 bgcolor=#fefefe
| 338272 ||  || — || October 13, 2002 || Kitt Peak || Spacewatch || — || align=right data-sort-value="0.71" | 710 m || 
|-id=273 bgcolor=#fefefe
| 338273 ||  || — || October 15, 2002 || Palomar || NEAT || — || align=right data-sort-value="0.83" | 830 m || 
|-id=274 bgcolor=#d6d6d6
| 338274 Valancius ||  ||  || October 5, 2002 || Palomar || K. Černis || — || align=right | 2.2 km || 
|-id=275 bgcolor=#fefefe
| 338275 ||  || — || October 4, 2002 || Apache Point || SDSS || FLO || align=right data-sort-value="0.56" | 560 m || 
|-id=276 bgcolor=#d6d6d6
| 338276 ||  || — || October 4, 2002 || Apache Point || SDSS || SAN || align=right | 1.8 km || 
|-id=277 bgcolor=#d6d6d6
| 338277 ||  || — || October 5, 2002 || Apache Point || SDSS || — || align=right | 2.3 km || 
|-id=278 bgcolor=#d6d6d6
| 338278 ||  || — || October 5, 2002 || Apache Point || SDSS || — || align=right | 2.0 km || 
|-id=279 bgcolor=#d6d6d6
| 338279 ||  || — || October 5, 2002 || Apache Point || SDSS || TRE || align=right | 2.1 km || 
|-id=280 bgcolor=#d6d6d6
| 338280 ||  || — || October 5, 2002 || Apache Point || SDSS || BRA || align=right | 1.6 km || 
|-id=281 bgcolor=#fefefe
| 338281 ||  || — || October 10, 2002 || Apache Point || SDSS || — || align=right data-sort-value="0.65" | 650 m || 
|-id=282 bgcolor=#fefefe
| 338282 ||  || — || October 10, 2002 || Apache Point || SDSS || — || align=right data-sort-value="0.75" | 750 m || 
|-id=283 bgcolor=#fefefe
| 338283 ||  || — || October 6, 2002 || Palomar || NEAT || — || align=right data-sort-value="0.72" | 720 m || 
|-id=284 bgcolor=#fefefe
| 338284 Hodál ||  ||  || October 9, 2002 || Palomar || NEAT || H || align=right data-sort-value="0.61" | 610 m || 
|-id=285 bgcolor=#fefefe
| 338285 ||  || — || October 15, 2002 || Palomar || NEAT || — || align=right data-sort-value="0.86" | 860 m || 
|-id=286 bgcolor=#E9E9E9
| 338286 ||  || — || September 15, 2002 || Anderson Mesa || LONEOS || — || align=right | 3.6 km || 
|-id=287 bgcolor=#fefefe
| 338287 ||  || — || October 2, 2002 || Socorro || LINEAR || — || align=right | 1.0 km || 
|-id=288 bgcolor=#d6d6d6
| 338288 ||  || — || October 28, 2002 || Haleakala || NEAT || — || align=right | 3.7 km || 
|-id=289 bgcolor=#fefefe
| 338289 ||  || — || October 31, 2002 || Anderson Mesa || LONEOS || H || align=right data-sort-value="0.88" | 880 m || 
|-id=290 bgcolor=#FA8072
| 338290 ||  || — || October 31, 2002 || Socorro || LINEAR || H || align=right | 1.0 km || 
|-id=291 bgcolor=#fefefe
| 338291 ||  || — || October 31, 2002 || Palomar || NEAT || FLO || align=right data-sort-value="0.70" | 700 m || 
|-id=292 bgcolor=#FFC2E0
| 338292 ||  || — || October 31, 2002 || Socorro || LINEAR || ATE || align=right data-sort-value="0.56" | 560 m || 
|-id=293 bgcolor=#FA8072
| 338293 ||  || — || October 31, 2002 || Palomar || NEAT || — || align=right data-sort-value="0.75" | 750 m || 
|-id=294 bgcolor=#fefefe
| 338294 ||  || — || October 31, 2002 || Palomar || NEAT || — || align=right data-sort-value="0.98" | 980 m || 
|-id=295 bgcolor=#d6d6d6
| 338295 ||  || — || October 31, 2002 || Anderson Mesa || LONEOS || JLI || align=right | 5.2 km || 
|-id=296 bgcolor=#fefefe
| 338296 ||  || — || October 15, 2002 || Palomar || NEAT || V || align=right data-sort-value="0.64" | 640 m || 
|-id=297 bgcolor=#fefefe
| 338297 ||  || — || October 30, 2002 || Apache Point || SDSS || — || align=right data-sort-value="0.59" | 590 m || 
|-id=298 bgcolor=#d6d6d6
| 338298 ||  || — || October 30, 2002 || Apache Point || SDSS || — || align=right | 2.1 km || 
|-id=299 bgcolor=#fefefe
| 338299 ||  || — || October 30, 2002 || Apache Point || SDSS || FLO || align=right data-sort-value="0.64" | 640 m || 
|-id=300 bgcolor=#FA8072
| 338300 ||  || — || October 30, 2002 || Socorro || LINEAR || H || align=right data-sort-value="0.77" | 770 m || 
|}

338301–338400 

|-bgcolor=#d6d6d6
| 338301 ||  || — || October 31, 2002 || Palomar || NEAT || NAE || align=right | 4.8 km || 
|-id=302 bgcolor=#d6d6d6
| 338302 ||  || — || October 31, 2002 || Palomar || NEAT || — || align=right | 2.1 km || 
|-id=303 bgcolor=#d6d6d6
| 338303 ||  || — || October 31, 2002 || Palomar || NEAT || KOR || align=right | 1.4 km || 
|-id=304 bgcolor=#fefefe
| 338304 ||  || — || October 31, 2002 || Palomar || NEAT || FLO || align=right data-sort-value="0.67" | 670 m || 
|-id=305 bgcolor=#d6d6d6
| 338305 ||  || — || November 1, 2002 || Palomar || NEAT || — || align=right | 4.4 km || 
|-id=306 bgcolor=#d6d6d6
| 338306 ||  || — || November 1, 2002 || Palomar || NEAT || EOS || align=right | 2.2 km || 
|-id=307 bgcolor=#d6d6d6
| 338307 ||  || — || November 1, 2002 || Palomar || NEAT || — || align=right | 4.5 km || 
|-id=308 bgcolor=#fefefe
| 338308 ||  || — || October 31, 2002 || Anderson Mesa || LONEOS || — || align=right | 1.0 km || 
|-id=309 bgcolor=#fefefe
| 338309 ||  || — || November 7, 2002 || Socorro || LINEAR || DAT || align=right data-sort-value="0.84" | 840 m || 
|-id=310 bgcolor=#fefefe
| 338310 ||  || — || November 5, 2002 || Anderson Mesa || LONEOS || H || align=right | 1.0 km || 
|-id=311 bgcolor=#d6d6d6
| 338311 ||  || — || November 5, 2002 || Socorro || LINEAR || JLI || align=right | 4.2 km || 
|-id=312 bgcolor=#d6d6d6
| 338312 ||  || — || November 5, 2002 || Socorro || LINEAR || EOS || align=right | 4.8 km || 
|-id=313 bgcolor=#d6d6d6
| 338313 ||  || — || November 4, 2002 || Haleakala || NEAT || — || align=right | 4.0 km || 
|-id=314 bgcolor=#fefefe
| 338314 ||  || — || November 6, 2002 || Socorro || LINEAR || — || align=right data-sort-value="0.88" | 880 m || 
|-id=315 bgcolor=#d6d6d6
| 338315 ||  || — || November 6, 2002 || Socorro || LINEAR || — || align=right | 3.4 km || 
|-id=316 bgcolor=#fefefe
| 338316 ||  || — || November 3, 2002 || Haleakala || NEAT || — || align=right | 1.2 km || 
|-id=317 bgcolor=#fefefe
| 338317 ||  || — || November 6, 2002 || Socorro || LINEAR || FLO || align=right data-sort-value="0.89" | 890 m || 
|-id=318 bgcolor=#fefefe
| 338318 ||  || — || November 3, 2002 || La Palma || La Palma Obs. || V || align=right data-sort-value="0.66" | 660 m || 
|-id=319 bgcolor=#d6d6d6
| 338319 ||  || — || November 7, 2002 || Socorro || LINEAR || — || align=right | 4.0 km || 
|-id=320 bgcolor=#fefefe
| 338320 ||  || — || November 8, 2002 || Socorro || LINEAR || H || align=right data-sort-value="0.70" | 700 m || 
|-id=321 bgcolor=#d6d6d6
| 338321 ||  || — || November 7, 2002 || Needville || Needville Obs. || — || align=right | 2.5 km || 
|-id=322 bgcolor=#d6d6d6
| 338322 ||  || — || November 12, 2002 || Socorro || LINEAR || EOS || align=right | 2.8 km || 
|-id=323 bgcolor=#fefefe
| 338323 ||  || — || November 13, 2002 || Kitt Peak || Spacewatch || — || align=right | 1.0 km || 
|-id=324 bgcolor=#fefefe
| 338324 ||  || — || November 12, 2002 || Socorro || LINEAR || V || align=right data-sort-value="0.69" | 690 m || 
|-id=325 bgcolor=#d6d6d6
| 338325 ||  || — || November 13, 2002 || Palomar || NEAT || — || align=right | 4.3 km || 
|-id=326 bgcolor=#d6d6d6
| 338326 ||  || — || November 12, 2002 || Palomar || NEAT || — || align=right | 4.3 km || 
|-id=327 bgcolor=#d6d6d6
| 338327 ||  || — || October 14, 2001 || Kitt Peak || Spacewatch || TIR || align=right | 4.0 km || 
|-id=328 bgcolor=#d6d6d6
| 338328 ||  || — || November 15, 2002 || Socorro || LINEAR || MEL || align=right | 4.6 km || 
|-id=329 bgcolor=#E9E9E9
| 338329 ||  || — || October 30, 2002 || Kitt Peak || Spacewatch || — || align=right | 2.6 km || 
|-id=330 bgcolor=#d6d6d6
| 338330 ||  || — || November 5, 2002 || Nyukasa || Mount Nyukasa Stn. || — || align=right | 2.7 km || 
|-id=331 bgcolor=#d6d6d6
| 338331 ||  || — || November 5, 2002 || Nyukasa || Mount Nyukasa Stn. || EOS || align=right | 2.2 km || 
|-id=332 bgcolor=#d6d6d6
| 338332 ||  || — || November 14, 2002 || Palomar || NEAT || ALA || align=right | 4.0 km || 
|-id=333 bgcolor=#C2FFFF
| 338333 ||  || — || November 13, 2002 || Palomar || NEAT || L5 || align=right | 13 km || 
|-id=334 bgcolor=#fefefe
| 338334 ||  || — || November 5, 2002 || Palomar || NEAT || FLO || align=right data-sort-value="0.60" | 600 m || 
|-id=335 bgcolor=#FA8072
| 338335 ||  || — || November 22, 2002 || Palomar || NEAT || H || align=right data-sort-value="0.65" | 650 m || 
|-id=336 bgcolor=#FA8072
| 338336 ||  || — || November 22, 2002 || Palomar || NEAT || — || align=right | 1.0 km || 
|-id=337 bgcolor=#d6d6d6
| 338337 ||  || — || November 24, 2002 || Palomar || NEAT || JLI || align=right | 3.4 km || 
|-id=338 bgcolor=#d6d6d6
| 338338 ||  || — || November 24, 2002 || Palomar || NEAT || — || align=right | 3.4 km || 
|-id=339 bgcolor=#d6d6d6
| 338339 ||  || — || November 24, 2002 || Palomar || NEAT || — || align=right | 2.6 km || 
|-id=340 bgcolor=#d6d6d6
| 338340 ||  || — || November 28, 2002 || Haleakala || NEAT || EOS || align=right | 2.4 km || 
|-id=341 bgcolor=#d6d6d6
| 338341 ||  || — || November 29, 2002 || Pla D'Arguines || Pla D'Arguines Obs. || — || align=right | 4.3 km || 
|-id=342 bgcolor=#fefefe
| 338342 ||  || — || November 24, 2002 || Palomar || S. F. Hönig || — || align=right data-sort-value="0.86" | 860 m || 
|-id=343 bgcolor=#C2FFFF
| 338343 ||  || — || November 24, 2002 || Palomar || S. F. Hönig || L5010 || align=right | 10 km || 
|-id=344 bgcolor=#fefefe
| 338344 ||  || — || November 24, 2002 || Palomar || NEAT || FLO || align=right data-sort-value="0.78" | 780 m || 
|-id=345 bgcolor=#C2FFFF
| 338345 ||  || — || November 16, 2002 || Palomar || NEAT || L5 || align=right | 10 km || 
|-id=346 bgcolor=#d6d6d6
| 338346 ||  || — || December 1, 2002 || Socorro || LINEAR || — || align=right | 3.4 km || 
|-id=347 bgcolor=#FFC2E0
| 338347 ||  || — || December 2, 2002 || Socorro || LINEAR || AMO +1km || align=right | 1.4 km || 
|-id=348 bgcolor=#fefefe
| 338348 ||  || — || December 3, 2002 || Palomar || NEAT || — || align=right data-sort-value="0.94" | 940 m || 
|-id=349 bgcolor=#d6d6d6
| 338349 ||  || — || December 3, 2002 || Palomar || NEAT || — || align=right | 4.1 km || 
|-id=350 bgcolor=#d6d6d6
| 338350 ||  || — || December 3, 2002 || Palomar || NEAT || — || align=right | 3.4 km || 
|-id=351 bgcolor=#fefefe
| 338351 ||  || — || December 2, 2002 || Socorro || LINEAR || FLO || align=right data-sort-value="0.66" | 660 m || 
|-id=352 bgcolor=#fefefe
| 338352 ||  || — || December 3, 2002 || Haleakala || NEAT || — || align=right | 1.0 km || 
|-id=353 bgcolor=#d6d6d6
| 338353 ||  || — || December 5, 2002 || Socorro || LINEAR || — || align=right | 3.0 km || 
|-id=354 bgcolor=#fefefe
| 338354 ||  || — || December 5, 2002 || Socorro || LINEAR || — || align=right | 1.2 km || 
|-id=355 bgcolor=#fefefe
| 338355 ||  || — || December 6, 2002 || Socorro || LINEAR || — || align=right data-sort-value="0.90" | 900 m || 
|-id=356 bgcolor=#d6d6d6
| 338356 ||  || — || December 8, 2002 || Desert Eagle || W. K. Y. Yeung || — || align=right | 2.9 km || 
|-id=357 bgcolor=#d6d6d6
| 338357 ||  || — || December 10, 2002 || Socorro || LINEAR || — || align=right | 4.5 km || 
|-id=358 bgcolor=#d6d6d6
| 338358 ||  || — || December 6, 2002 || Socorro || LINEAR || — || align=right | 5.3 km || 
|-id=359 bgcolor=#d6d6d6
| 338359 ||  || — || December 10, 2002 || Socorro || LINEAR || — || align=right | 3.3 km || 
|-id=360 bgcolor=#d6d6d6
| 338360 ||  || — || December 10, 2002 || Socorro || LINEAR || EOS || align=right | 2.6 km || 
|-id=361 bgcolor=#fefefe
| 338361 ||  || — || December 10, 2002 || Socorro || LINEAR || — || align=right | 1.0 km || 
|-id=362 bgcolor=#d6d6d6
| 338362 ||  || — || December 11, 2002 || Socorro || LINEAR || — || align=right | 3.2 km || 
|-id=363 bgcolor=#d6d6d6
| 338363 ||  || — || December 11, 2002 || Socorro || LINEAR || — || align=right | 4.0 km || 
|-id=364 bgcolor=#fefefe
| 338364 ||  || — || December 5, 2002 || Socorro || LINEAR || — || align=right data-sort-value="0.99" | 990 m || 
|-id=365 bgcolor=#fefefe
| 338365 ||  || — || December 5, 2002 || Socorro || LINEAR || FLO || align=right data-sort-value="0.75" | 750 m || 
|-id=366 bgcolor=#d6d6d6
| 338366 ||  || — || December 5, 2002 || Socorro || LINEAR || — || align=right | 3.4 km || 
|-id=367 bgcolor=#fefefe
| 338367 ||  || — || December 5, 2002 || Socorro || LINEAR || — || align=right | 1.0 km || 
|-id=368 bgcolor=#fefefe
| 338368 ||  || — || December 3, 2002 || Palomar || NEAT || — || align=right | 2.1 km || 
|-id=369 bgcolor=#fefefe
| 338369 ||  || — || October 12, 2005 || Apache Point || SDSS || — || align=right data-sort-value="0.81" | 810 m || 
|-id=370 bgcolor=#fefefe
| 338370 ||  || — || December 10, 2002 || Palomar || NEAT || FLO || align=right data-sort-value="0.72" | 720 m || 
|-id=371 bgcolor=#d6d6d6
| 338371 ||  || — || December 10, 2002 || Palomar || NEAT || — || align=right | 2.8 km || 
|-id=372 bgcolor=#C2FFFF
| 338372 ||  || — || December 3, 2002 || Palomar || NEAT || L5 || align=right | 12 km || 
|-id=373 bgcolor=#d6d6d6
| 338373 Fonóalbert ||  ||  || December 25, 2002 || Piszkéstető || K. Sárneczky || — || align=right | 3.4 km || 
|-id=374 bgcolor=#d6d6d6
| 338374 ||  || — || December 28, 2002 || Socorro || LINEAR || — || align=right | 3.8 km || 
|-id=375 bgcolor=#fefefe
| 338375 ||  || — || December 31, 2002 || Socorro || LINEAR || — || align=right | 2.5 km || 
|-id=376 bgcolor=#fefefe
| 338376 ||  || — || December 31, 2002 || Socorro || LINEAR || FLO || align=right data-sort-value="0.94" | 940 m || 
|-id=377 bgcolor=#d6d6d6
| 338377 ||  || — || December 31, 2002 || Socorro || LINEAR || — || align=right | 3.3 km || 
|-id=378 bgcolor=#fefefe
| 338378 ||  || — || December 31, 2002 || Socorro || LINEAR || FLO || align=right data-sort-value="0.94" | 940 m || 
|-id=379 bgcolor=#d6d6d6
| 338379 ||  || — || December 31, 2002 || Socorro || LINEAR || — || align=right | 4.6 km || 
|-id=380 bgcolor=#d6d6d6
| 338380 ||  || — || December 31, 2002 || Socorro || LINEAR || — || align=right | 3.0 km || 
|-id=381 bgcolor=#d6d6d6
| 338381 ||  || — || December 31, 2002 || Socorro || LINEAR || — || align=right | 3.5 km || 
|-id=382 bgcolor=#d6d6d6
| 338382 ||  || — || December 31, 2002 || Socorro || LINEAR || — || align=right | 3.7 km || 
|-id=383 bgcolor=#d6d6d6
| 338383 ||  || — || December 27, 2002 || Palomar || NEAT || JLI || align=right | 3.1 km || 
|-id=384 bgcolor=#d6d6d6
| 338384 ||  || — || January 1, 2003 || Socorro || LINEAR || — || align=right | 4.8 km || 
|-id=385 bgcolor=#fefefe
| 338385 ||  || — || January 1, 2003 || Socorro || LINEAR || — || align=right | 1.2 km || 
|-id=386 bgcolor=#fefefe
| 338386 ||  || — || January 3, 2003 || Nashville || R. Clingan || — || align=right data-sort-value="0.71" | 710 m || 
|-id=387 bgcolor=#fefefe
| 338387 ||  || — || January 1, 2003 || Socorro || LINEAR || — || align=right | 1.4 km || 
|-id=388 bgcolor=#d6d6d6
| 338388 ||  || — || January 1, 2003 || Socorro || LINEAR || — || align=right | 4.4 km || 
|-id=389 bgcolor=#fefefe
| 338389 ||  || — || January 5, 2003 || Socorro || LINEAR || V || align=right | 1.0 km || 
|-id=390 bgcolor=#fefefe
| 338390 ||  || — || January 5, 2003 || Socorro || LINEAR || — || align=right | 1.1 km || 
|-id=391 bgcolor=#fefefe
| 338391 ||  || — || January 7, 2003 || Socorro || LINEAR || — || align=right | 1.1 km || 
|-id=392 bgcolor=#fefefe
| 338392 ||  || — || January 7, 2003 || Socorro || LINEAR || — || align=right | 1.3 km || 
|-id=393 bgcolor=#d6d6d6
| 338393 ||  || — || January 5, 2003 || Socorro || LINEAR || — || align=right | 4.0 km || 
|-id=394 bgcolor=#d6d6d6
| 338394 ||  || — || January 5, 2003 || Socorro || LINEAR || YAK || align=right | 3.6 km || 
|-id=395 bgcolor=#d6d6d6
| 338395 ||  || — || January 7, 2003 || Socorro || LINEAR || EUP || align=right | 6.2 km || 
|-id=396 bgcolor=#d6d6d6
| 338396 ||  || — || January 7, 2003 || Socorro || LINEAR || — || align=right | 4.8 km || 
|-id=397 bgcolor=#d6d6d6
| 338397 ||  || — || January 10, 2003 || Socorro || LINEAR || — || align=right | 3.6 km || 
|-id=398 bgcolor=#d6d6d6
| 338398 ||  || — || January 1, 2003 || Socorro || LINEAR || — || align=right | 4.1 km || 
|-id=399 bgcolor=#fefefe
| 338399 ||  || — || January 5, 2003 || Socorro || LINEAR || FLO || align=right data-sort-value="0.91" | 910 m || 
|-id=400 bgcolor=#d6d6d6
| 338400 || 2003 BK || — || January 20, 2003 || Wrightwood || J. W. Young || — || align=right | 3.0 km || 
|}

338401–338500 

|-bgcolor=#d6d6d6
| 338401 ||  || — || January 24, 2003 || La Silla || A. Boattini, H. Scholl || — || align=right | 4.2 km || 
|-id=402 bgcolor=#d6d6d6
| 338402 ||  || — || January 23, 2003 || Kvistaberg || UDAS || TIR || align=right | 4.1 km || 
|-id=403 bgcolor=#fefefe
| 338403 ||  || — || January 26, 2003 || Anderson Mesa || LONEOS || EUT || align=right data-sort-value="0.92" | 920 m || 
|-id=404 bgcolor=#fefefe
| 338404 ||  || — || January 26, 2003 || Haleakala || NEAT || — || align=right | 1.1 km || 
|-id=405 bgcolor=#d6d6d6
| 338405 ||  || — || January 27, 2003 || Anderson Mesa || LONEOS || — || align=right | 5.0 km || 
|-id=406 bgcolor=#fefefe
| 338406 ||  || — || January 27, 2003 || Socorro || LINEAR || H || align=right | 1.1 km || 
|-id=407 bgcolor=#fefefe
| 338407 ||  || — || January 27, 2003 || Anderson Mesa || LONEOS || H || align=right data-sort-value="0.98" | 980 m || 
|-id=408 bgcolor=#d6d6d6
| 338408 ||  || — || January 26, 2003 || Haleakala || NEAT || — || align=right | 5.5 km || 
|-id=409 bgcolor=#d6d6d6
| 338409 ||  || — || January 27, 2003 || Socorro || LINEAR || — || align=right | 4.4 km || 
|-id=410 bgcolor=#fefefe
| 338410 ||  || — || January 27, 2003 || Socorro || LINEAR || — || align=right | 2.2 km || 
|-id=411 bgcolor=#d6d6d6
| 338411 ||  || — || January 27, 2003 || Haleakala || NEAT || — || align=right | 4.3 km || 
|-id=412 bgcolor=#fefefe
| 338412 ||  || — || January 28, 2003 || Socorro || LINEAR || — || align=right | 1.0 km || 
|-id=413 bgcolor=#d6d6d6
| 338413 ||  || — || January 26, 2003 || Kitt Peak || Spacewatch || — || align=right | 3.0 km || 
|-id=414 bgcolor=#fefefe
| 338414 ||  || — || January 27, 2003 || Socorro || LINEAR || — || align=right data-sort-value="0.83" | 830 m || 
|-id=415 bgcolor=#fefefe
| 338415 ||  || — || January 27, 2003 || Socorro || LINEAR || NYS || align=right data-sort-value="0.71" | 710 m || 
|-id=416 bgcolor=#d6d6d6
| 338416 ||  || — || December 5, 2002 || Kitt Peak || Spacewatch || — || align=right | 2.8 km || 
|-id=417 bgcolor=#d6d6d6
| 338417 ||  || — || January 27, 2003 || Socorro || LINEAR || THB || align=right | 4.0 km || 
|-id=418 bgcolor=#d6d6d6
| 338418 ||  || — || January 27, 2003 || Socorro || LINEAR || — || align=right | 4.8 km || 
|-id=419 bgcolor=#fefefe
| 338419 ||  || — || January 27, 2003 || Palomar || NEAT || — || align=right | 2.0 km || 
|-id=420 bgcolor=#d6d6d6
| 338420 ||  || — || January 28, 2003 || Palomar || NEAT || — || align=right | 3.3 km || 
|-id=421 bgcolor=#fefefe
| 338421 ||  || — || January 30, 2003 || Anderson Mesa || LONEOS || NYS || align=right data-sort-value="0.83" | 830 m || 
|-id=422 bgcolor=#fefefe
| 338422 ||  || — || January 30, 2003 || Anderson Mesa || LONEOS || FLO || align=right data-sort-value="0.88" | 880 m || 
|-id=423 bgcolor=#d6d6d6
| 338423 ||  || — || January 31, 2003 || Socorro || LINEAR || — || align=right | 4.7 km || 
|-id=424 bgcolor=#d6d6d6
| 338424 ||  || — || January 31, 2003 || Anderson Mesa || LONEOS || — || align=right | 3.1 km || 
|-id=425 bgcolor=#d6d6d6
| 338425 ||  || — || February 1, 2003 || Palomar || NEAT || Tj (2.99) || align=right | 6.9 km || 
|-id=426 bgcolor=#fefefe
| 338426 ||  || — || February 1, 2003 || Haleakala || NEAT || H || align=right data-sort-value="0.94" | 940 m || 
|-id=427 bgcolor=#d6d6d6
| 338427 ||  || — || February 1, 2003 || Socorro || LINEAR || — || align=right | 3.7 km || 
|-id=428 bgcolor=#fefefe
| 338428 ||  || — || February 1, 2003 || Socorro || LINEAR || — || align=right | 2.2 km || 
|-id=429 bgcolor=#d6d6d6
| 338429 ||  || — || February 2, 2003 || Socorro || LINEAR || — || align=right | 3.8 km || 
|-id=430 bgcolor=#d6d6d6
| 338430 ||  || — || February 4, 2003 || Kitt Peak || Spacewatch || THM || align=right | 2.7 km || 
|-id=431 bgcolor=#fefefe
| 338431 ||  || — || February 3, 2003 || Socorro || LINEAR || — || align=right data-sort-value="0.90" | 900 m || 
|-id=432 bgcolor=#fefefe
| 338432 ||  || — || February 7, 2003 || Palomar || NEAT || — || align=right | 1.0 km || 
|-id=433 bgcolor=#d6d6d6
| 338433 ||  || — || February 1, 2003 || Palomar || NEAT || — || align=right | 5.0 km || 
|-id=434 bgcolor=#fefefe
| 338434 ||  || — || February 3, 2003 || Anderson Mesa || LONEOS || — || align=right | 1.2 km || 
|-id=435 bgcolor=#fefefe
| 338435 ||  || — || February 2, 2003 || Palomar || NEAT || — || align=right | 1.7 km || 
|-id=436 bgcolor=#fefefe
| 338436 ||  || — || February 25, 2003 || Campo Imperatore || CINEOS || V || align=right | 1.0 km || 
|-id=437 bgcolor=#d6d6d6
| 338437 ||  || — || February 24, 2003 || Needville || W. G. Dillon, J. Dellinger || — || align=right | 4.4 km || 
|-id=438 bgcolor=#fefefe
| 338438 ||  || — || March 7, 2003 || Socorro || LINEAR || V || align=right | 1.1 km || 
|-id=439 bgcolor=#fefefe
| 338439 ||  || — || March 7, 2003 || Socorro || LINEAR || — || align=right | 1.8 km || 
|-id=440 bgcolor=#d6d6d6
| 338440 ||  || — || March 6, 2003 || Anderson Mesa || LONEOS || LIX || align=right | 5.0 km || 
|-id=441 bgcolor=#d6d6d6
| 338441 ||  || — || March 7, 2003 || Socorro || LINEAR || — || align=right | 3.4 km || 
|-id=442 bgcolor=#fefefe
| 338442 ||  || — || March 7, 2003 || Kitt Peak || Spacewatch || — || align=right data-sort-value="0.84" | 840 m || 
|-id=443 bgcolor=#d6d6d6
| 338443 ||  || — || March 8, 2003 || Palomar || NEAT || — || align=right | 5.1 km || 
|-id=444 bgcolor=#d6d6d6
| 338444 ||  || — || March 8, 2003 || Palomar || NEAT || THB || align=right | 3.3 km || 
|-id=445 bgcolor=#FA8072
| 338445 ||  || — || March 9, 2003 || Anderson Mesa || LONEOS || — || align=right | 1.8 km || 
|-id=446 bgcolor=#fefefe
| 338446 ||  || — || March 9, 2003 || Anderson Mesa || LONEOS || H || align=right | 1.0 km || 
|-id=447 bgcolor=#fefefe
| 338447 ||  || — || March 10, 2003 || Socorro || LINEAR || V || align=right data-sort-value="0.92" | 920 m || 
|-id=448 bgcolor=#fefefe
| 338448 ||  || — || March 10, 2003 || Palomar || NEAT || — || align=right | 1.0 km || 
|-id=449 bgcolor=#fefefe
| 338449 ||  || — || March 10, 2003 || Kitt Peak || Spacewatch || H || align=right data-sort-value="0.66" | 660 m || 
|-id=450 bgcolor=#d6d6d6
| 338450 ||  || — || March 9, 2003 || Kitt Peak || DLS || — || align=right | 2.8 km || 
|-id=451 bgcolor=#fefefe
| 338451 ||  || — || March 9, 2003 || Socorro || LINEAR || — || align=right | 2.5 km || 
|-id=452 bgcolor=#fefefe
| 338452 ||  || — || March 23, 2003 || Eskridge || G. Hug || — || align=right | 1.0 km || 
|-id=453 bgcolor=#fefefe
| 338453 ||  || — || March 26, 2003 || Palomar || NEAT || H || align=right | 1.0 km || 
|-id=454 bgcolor=#d6d6d6
| 338454 ||  || — || March 24, 2003 || Nashville || R. Clingan || — || align=right | 3.4 km || 
|-id=455 bgcolor=#E9E9E9
| 338455 ||  || — || March 26, 2003 || Campo Imperatore || CINEOS || — || align=right | 1.4 km || 
|-id=456 bgcolor=#fefefe
| 338456 ||  || — || March 31, 2003 || Socorro || LINEAR || H || align=right data-sort-value="0.70" | 700 m || 
|-id=457 bgcolor=#d6d6d6
| 338457 ||  || — || March 23, 2003 || Kitt Peak || Spacewatch || — || align=right | 3.6 km || 
|-id=458 bgcolor=#fefefe
| 338458 ||  || — || March 23, 2003 || Palomar || NEAT || — || align=right | 2.2 km || 
|-id=459 bgcolor=#fefefe
| 338459 ||  || — || March 24, 2003 || Kitt Peak || Spacewatch || NYS || align=right data-sort-value="0.88" | 880 m || 
|-id=460 bgcolor=#fefefe
| 338460 ||  || — || March 24, 2003 || Kitt Peak || Spacewatch || — || align=right | 1.1 km || 
|-id=461 bgcolor=#fefefe
| 338461 ||  || — || March 23, 2003 || Kitt Peak || Spacewatch || NYS || align=right data-sort-value="0.76" | 760 m || 
|-id=462 bgcolor=#fefefe
| 338462 ||  || — || March 24, 2003 || Kitt Peak || Spacewatch || — || align=right data-sort-value="0.80" | 800 m || 
|-id=463 bgcolor=#d6d6d6
| 338463 ||  || — || March 26, 2003 || Palomar || NEAT || — || align=right | 3.7 km || 
|-id=464 bgcolor=#fefefe
| 338464 ||  || — || March 26, 2003 || Palomar || NEAT || — || align=right | 1.2 km || 
|-id=465 bgcolor=#fefefe
| 338465 ||  || — || March 26, 2003 || Kitt Peak || Spacewatch || PHO || align=right | 1.3 km || 
|-id=466 bgcolor=#fefefe
| 338466 ||  || — || March 26, 2003 || Palomar || NEAT || FLO || align=right data-sort-value="0.91" | 910 m || 
|-id=467 bgcolor=#fefefe
| 338467 ||  || — || March 26, 2003 || Kitt Peak || Spacewatch || — || align=right | 1.4 km || 
|-id=468 bgcolor=#d6d6d6
| 338468 ||  || — || March 27, 2003 || Kitt Peak || Spacewatch || LIX || align=right | 4.5 km || 
|-id=469 bgcolor=#fefefe
| 338469 ||  || — || March 27, 2003 || Kitt Peak || Spacewatch || MAS || align=right data-sort-value="0.93" | 930 m || 
|-id=470 bgcolor=#fefefe
| 338470 ||  || — || March 27, 2003 || Palomar || NEAT || — || align=right | 1.2 km || 
|-id=471 bgcolor=#E9E9E9
| 338471 ||  || — || March 28, 2003 || Kitt Peak || Spacewatch || — || align=right | 1.3 km || 
|-id=472 bgcolor=#fefefe
| 338472 ||  || — || March 31, 2003 || Kitt Peak || Spacewatch || — || align=right data-sort-value="0.96" | 960 m || 
|-id=473 bgcolor=#d6d6d6
| 338473 ||  || — || March 31, 2003 || Kitt Peak || Spacewatch || — || align=right | 3.6 km || 
|-id=474 bgcolor=#d6d6d6
| 338474 ||  || — || March 31, 2003 || Catalina || CSS || — || align=right | 3.8 km || 
|-id=475 bgcolor=#fefefe
| 338475 ||  || — || March 24, 2003 || Kitt Peak || Spacewatch || EUT || align=right data-sort-value="0.72" | 720 m || 
|-id=476 bgcolor=#fefefe
| 338476 ||  || — || April 9, 2003 || Socorro || LINEAR || — || align=right | 1.1 km || 
|-id=477 bgcolor=#fefefe
| 338477 ||  || — || April 10, 2003 || Kitt Peak || Spacewatch || — || align=right | 2.0 km || 
|-id=478 bgcolor=#fefefe
| 338478 ||  || — || April 3, 2003 || Anderson Mesa || LONEOS || H || align=right data-sort-value="0.65" | 650 m || 
|-id=479 bgcolor=#fefefe
| 338479 ||  || — || April 6, 2003 || Kitt Peak || Spacewatch || NYS || align=right data-sort-value="0.78" | 780 m || 
|-id=480 bgcolor=#fefefe
| 338480 ||  || — || April 24, 2003 || Kitt Peak || Spacewatch || H || align=right data-sort-value="0.55" | 550 m || 
|-id=481 bgcolor=#fefefe
| 338481 ||  || — || April 24, 2003 || Anderson Mesa || LONEOS || — || align=right | 1.1 km || 
|-id=482 bgcolor=#d6d6d6
| 338482 ||  || — || April 24, 2003 || Anderson Mesa || LONEOS || — || align=right | 4.1 km || 
|-id=483 bgcolor=#fefefe
| 338483 ||  || — || April 25, 2003 || Kitt Peak || Spacewatch || H || align=right data-sort-value="0.65" | 650 m || 
|-id=484 bgcolor=#fefefe
| 338484 ||  || — || April 26, 2003 || Socorro || LINEAR || H || align=right data-sort-value="0.87" | 870 m || 
|-id=485 bgcolor=#fefefe
| 338485 ||  || — || April 29, 2003 || Anderson Mesa || LONEOS || NYS || align=right data-sort-value="0.81" | 810 m || 
|-id=486 bgcolor=#fefefe
| 338486 ||  || — || April 29, 2003 || Socorro || LINEAR || CHL || align=right | 2.1 km || 
|-id=487 bgcolor=#E9E9E9
| 338487 ||  || — || April 29, 2003 || Socorro || LINEAR || — || align=right | 1.5 km || 
|-id=488 bgcolor=#E9E9E9
| 338488 ||  || — || April 29, 2003 || Socorro || LINEAR || — || align=right | 1.2 km || 
|-id=489 bgcolor=#d6d6d6
| 338489 ||  || — || May 1, 2003 || Socorro || LINEAR || EUP || align=right | 4.8 km || 
|-id=490 bgcolor=#E9E9E9
| 338490 ||  || — || May 26, 2003 || Kitt Peak || Spacewatch || — || align=right | 1.1 km || 
|-id=491 bgcolor=#E9E9E9
| 338491 ||  || — || May 31, 2003 || Kitt Peak || Spacewatch || — || align=right | 1.8 km || 
|-id=492 bgcolor=#E9E9E9
| 338492 ||  || — || May 26, 2003 || Kitt Peak || Spacewatch || JUN || align=right data-sort-value="0.65" | 650 m || 
|-id=493 bgcolor=#E9E9E9
| 338493 ||  || — || June 6, 2003 || Kitt Peak || Spacewatch || — || align=right | 1.5 km || 
|-id=494 bgcolor=#E9E9E9
| 338494 ||  || — || June 26, 2003 || Socorro || LINEAR || MAR || align=right | 2.1 km || 
|-id=495 bgcolor=#E9E9E9
| 338495 ||  || — || July 2, 2003 || Socorro || LINEAR || — || align=right | 2.2 km || 
|-id=496 bgcolor=#E9E9E9
| 338496 ||  || — || July 3, 2003 || Kitt Peak || Spacewatch || — || align=right | 2.0 km || 
|-id=497 bgcolor=#E9E9E9
| 338497 ||  || — || July 22, 2003 || Palomar || NEAT || — || align=right | 1.3 km || 
|-id=498 bgcolor=#E9E9E9
| 338498 ||  || — || July 29, 2003 || Socorro || LINEAR || JUN || align=right | 1.1 km || 
|-id=499 bgcolor=#E9E9E9
| 338499 ||  || — || July 22, 2003 || Palomar || NEAT || EUN || align=right | 1.4 km || 
|-id=500 bgcolor=#E9E9E9
| 338500 ||  || — || July 26, 2003 || Palomar || NEAT || JNS || align=right | 4.2 km || 
|}

338501–338600 

|-bgcolor=#E9E9E9
| 338501 ||  || — || July 24, 2003 || Palomar || NEAT || — || align=right | 1.7 km || 
|-id=502 bgcolor=#E9E9E9
| 338502 ||  || — || August 4, 2003 || Kitt Peak || Spacewatch || — || align=right | 2.6 km || 
|-id=503 bgcolor=#E9E9E9
| 338503 ||  || — || August 5, 2003 || Kvistaberg || UDAS || — || align=right | 2.3 km || 
|-id=504 bgcolor=#E9E9E9
| 338504 ||  || — || August 1, 2003 || Socorro || LINEAR || JUN || align=right | 1.4 km || 
|-id=505 bgcolor=#E9E9E9
| 338505 ||  || — || August 2, 2003 || Bergisch Gladbach || W. Bickel || — || align=right | 1.9 km || 
|-id=506 bgcolor=#E9E9E9
| 338506 ||  || — || August 18, 2003 || Campo Imperatore || CINEOS || ADE || align=right | 2.7 km || 
|-id=507 bgcolor=#E9E9E9
| 338507 ||  || — || August 21, 2003 || Palomar || NEAT || — || align=right | 1.8 km || 
|-id=508 bgcolor=#E9E9E9
| 338508 ||  || — || August 20, 2003 || Palomar || NEAT || JUN || align=right | 1.2 km || 
|-id=509 bgcolor=#E9E9E9
| 338509 ||  || — || August 22, 2003 || Palomar || NEAT || — || align=right | 1.9 km || 
|-id=510 bgcolor=#E9E9E9
| 338510 ||  || — || August 20, 2003 || Palomar || NEAT || — || align=right | 1.8 km || 
|-id=511 bgcolor=#E9E9E9
| 338511 ||  || — || August 20, 2003 || Palomar || NEAT || — || align=right | 1.5 km || 
|-id=512 bgcolor=#E9E9E9
| 338512 ||  || — || August 23, 2003 || Črni Vrh || Črni Vrh || — || align=right | 1.7 km || 
|-id=513 bgcolor=#E9E9E9
| 338513 ||  || — || August 21, 2003 || Palomar || NEAT || — || align=right | 1.6 km || 
|-id=514 bgcolor=#E9E9E9
| 338514 ||  || — || August 1, 2003 || Socorro || LINEAR || — || align=right | 2.3 km || 
|-id=515 bgcolor=#E9E9E9
| 338515 ||  || — || August 21, 2003 || Haleakala || NEAT || — || align=right | 3.1 km || 
|-id=516 bgcolor=#E9E9E9
| 338516 ||  || — || August 22, 2003 || Haleakala || NEAT || — || align=right | 2.2 km || 
|-id=517 bgcolor=#E9E9E9
| 338517 ||  || — || August 23, 2003 || Socorro || LINEAR || EUN || align=right | 1.7 km || 
|-id=518 bgcolor=#E9E9E9
| 338518 ||  || — || August 23, 2003 || Socorro || LINEAR || — || align=right | 1.9 km || 
|-id=519 bgcolor=#E9E9E9
| 338519 ||  || — || August 23, 2003 || Socorro || LINEAR || — || align=right | 2.2 km || 
|-id=520 bgcolor=#E9E9E9
| 338520 ||  || — || August 22, 2003 || Socorro || LINEAR || EUN || align=right | 1.7 km || 
|-id=521 bgcolor=#E9E9E9
| 338521 ||  || — || August 23, 2003 || Socorro || LINEAR || EUN || align=right | 1.6 km || 
|-id=522 bgcolor=#E9E9E9
| 338522 ||  || — || August 24, 2003 || Socorro || LINEAR || — || align=right | 2.7 km || 
|-id=523 bgcolor=#FA8072
| 338523 ||  || — || August 27, 2003 || Haleakala || NEAT || — || align=right | 2.3 km || 
|-id=524 bgcolor=#E9E9E9
| 338524 ||  || — || August 30, 2003 || Kitt Peak || Spacewatch || — || align=right | 1.4 km || 
|-id=525 bgcolor=#E9E9E9
| 338525 ||  || — || August 2, 2003 || Haleakala || NEAT || — || align=right | 2.8 km || 
|-id=526 bgcolor=#E9E9E9
| 338526 ||  || — || October 17, 2003 || Apache Point || SDSS || — || align=right | 1.9 km || 
|-id=527 bgcolor=#E9E9E9
| 338527 ||  || — || September 19, 2003 || Socorro || LINEAR || JUN || align=right | 1.0 km || 
|-id=528 bgcolor=#E9E9E9
| 338528 ||  || — || September 3, 2003 || Reedy Creek || J. Broughton || — || align=right | 2.7 km || 
|-id=529 bgcolor=#E9E9E9
| 338529 ||  || — || September 14, 2003 || Haleakala || NEAT || — || align=right | 2.9 km || 
|-id=530 bgcolor=#E9E9E9
| 338530 ||  || — || September 15, 2003 || Palomar || NEAT || — || align=right | 2.0 km || 
|-id=531 bgcolor=#E9E9E9
| 338531 ||  || — || September 15, 2003 || Palomar || NEAT || — || align=right | 1.6 km || 
|-id=532 bgcolor=#E9E9E9
| 338532 ||  || — || September 15, 2003 || Anderson Mesa || LONEOS || — || align=right | 1.7 km || 
|-id=533 bgcolor=#E9E9E9
| 338533 ||  || — || September 15, 2003 || Haleakala || NEAT || — || align=right | 2.6 km || 
|-id=534 bgcolor=#E9E9E9
| 338534 ||  || — || September 13, 2003 || Haleakala || NEAT || — || align=right | 3.1 km || 
|-id=535 bgcolor=#E9E9E9
| 338535 ||  || — || September 15, 2003 || Palomar || NEAT || — || align=right | 5.1 km || 
|-id=536 bgcolor=#E9E9E9
| 338536 ||  || — || September 15, 2003 || Palomar || NEAT || — || align=right | 2.9 km || 
|-id=537 bgcolor=#E9E9E9
| 338537 ||  || — || September 16, 2003 || Kleť || M. Tichý || — || align=right | 3.4 km || 
|-id=538 bgcolor=#E9E9E9
| 338538 ||  || — || September 16, 2003 || Palomar || NEAT || — || align=right | 2.2 km || 
|-id=539 bgcolor=#E9E9E9
| 338539 ||  || — || September 16, 2003 || Kitt Peak || Spacewatch || — || align=right | 1.8 km || 
|-id=540 bgcolor=#E9E9E9
| 338540 ||  || — || September 17, 2003 || Kitt Peak || Spacewatch || XIZ || align=right | 1.5 km || 
|-id=541 bgcolor=#E9E9E9
| 338541 ||  || — || September 16, 2003 || Kitt Peak || Spacewatch || — || align=right | 1.8 km || 
|-id=542 bgcolor=#E9E9E9
| 338542 ||  || — || September 16, 2003 || Kitt Peak || Spacewatch || WIT || align=right | 1.5 km || 
|-id=543 bgcolor=#E9E9E9
| 338543 ||  || — || September 17, 2003 || Socorro || LINEAR || MAR || align=right | 1.5 km || 
|-id=544 bgcolor=#E9E9E9
| 338544 ||  || — || September 18, 2003 || Palomar || NEAT || — || align=right | 2.1 km || 
|-id=545 bgcolor=#E9E9E9
| 338545 ||  || — || September 18, 2003 || Palomar || NEAT || — || align=right | 2.1 km || 
|-id=546 bgcolor=#E9E9E9
| 338546 ||  || — || September 18, 2003 || Kitt Peak || Spacewatch || — || align=right | 1.5 km || 
|-id=547 bgcolor=#E9E9E9
| 338547 ||  || — || September 18, 2003 || Kitt Peak || Spacewatch || — || align=right | 1.4 km || 
|-id=548 bgcolor=#E9E9E9
| 338548 ||  || — || September 16, 2003 || Palomar || NEAT || — || align=right | 4.5 km || 
|-id=549 bgcolor=#E9E9E9
| 338549 ||  || — || September 16, 2003 || Palomar || NEAT || INO || align=right | 1.6 km || 
|-id=550 bgcolor=#E9E9E9
| 338550 ||  || — || September 18, 2003 || Palomar || NEAT || ADE || align=right | 4.0 km || 
|-id=551 bgcolor=#E9E9E9
| 338551 ||  || — || September 18, 2003 || Palomar || NEAT || EUN || align=right | 2.1 km || 
|-id=552 bgcolor=#E9E9E9
| 338552 ||  || — || September 16, 2003 || Kitt Peak || Spacewatch || — || align=right | 2.7 km || 
|-id=553 bgcolor=#E9E9E9
| 338553 ||  || — || September 16, 2003 || Kitt Peak || Spacewatch || — || align=right | 1.1 km || 
|-id=554 bgcolor=#E9E9E9
| 338554 ||  || — || September 3, 2003 || Socorro || LINEAR || — || align=right | 1.9 km || 
|-id=555 bgcolor=#E9E9E9
| 338555 ||  || — || September 17, 2003 || Anderson Mesa || LONEOS || HNS || align=right | 1.6 km || 
|-id=556 bgcolor=#E9E9E9
| 338556 ||  || — || September 17, 2003 || Anderson Mesa || LONEOS || EUN || align=right | 1.5 km || 
|-id=557 bgcolor=#E9E9E9
| 338557 ||  || — || September 17, 2003 || Anderson Mesa || LONEOS || MAR || align=right | 1.9 km || 
|-id=558 bgcolor=#E9E9E9
| 338558 ||  || — || September 17, 2003 || Anderson Mesa || LONEOS || — || align=right | 3.1 km || 
|-id=559 bgcolor=#E9E9E9
| 338559 ||  || — || September 17, 2003 || Socorro || LINEAR || — || align=right | 2.3 km || 
|-id=560 bgcolor=#E9E9E9
| 338560 ||  || — || September 17, 2003 || Kitt Peak || Spacewatch || — || align=right | 2.7 km || 
|-id=561 bgcolor=#E9E9E9
| 338561 ||  || — || September 18, 2003 || Anderson Mesa || LONEOS || AER || align=right | 2.0 km || 
|-id=562 bgcolor=#E9E9E9
| 338562 ||  || — || September 18, 2003 || Anderson Mesa || LONEOS || JUN || align=right | 1.0 km || 
|-id=563 bgcolor=#E9E9E9
| 338563 ||  || — || September 18, 2003 || Kitt Peak || Spacewatch || — || align=right | 2.0 km || 
|-id=564 bgcolor=#E9E9E9
| 338564 ||  || — || September 18, 2003 || Kitt Peak || Spacewatch || WIT || align=right | 1.0 km || 
|-id=565 bgcolor=#E9E9E9
| 338565 ||  || — || September 19, 2003 || Kitt Peak || Spacewatch || — || align=right | 3.5 km || 
|-id=566 bgcolor=#E9E9E9
| 338566 ||  || — || September 16, 2003 || Anderson Mesa || LONEOS || — || align=right | 1.7 km || 
|-id=567 bgcolor=#FFC2E0
| 338567 ||  || — || September 19, 2003 || Kitt Peak || Spacewatch || AMO || align=right data-sort-value="0.47" | 470 m || 
|-id=568 bgcolor=#E9E9E9
| 338568 ||  || — || September 16, 2003 || Palomar || NEAT || — || align=right | 2.0 km || 
|-id=569 bgcolor=#E9E9E9
| 338569 ||  || — || September 16, 2003 || Kitt Peak || Spacewatch || — || align=right | 2.9 km || 
|-id=570 bgcolor=#E9E9E9
| 338570 ||  || — || September 16, 2003 || Palomar || NEAT || — || align=right | 3.9 km || 
|-id=571 bgcolor=#E9E9E9
| 338571 ||  || — || September 16, 2003 || Palomar || NEAT || — || align=right | 4.0 km || 
|-id=572 bgcolor=#E9E9E9
| 338572 ||  || — || September 18, 2003 || Kitt Peak || Spacewatch || — || align=right | 1.8 km || 
|-id=573 bgcolor=#E9E9E9
| 338573 ||  || — || September 19, 2003 || Campo Imperatore || CINEOS || GEF || align=right | 2.0 km || 
|-id=574 bgcolor=#E9E9E9
| 338574 ||  || — || September 20, 2003 || Palomar || NEAT || — || align=right | 3.4 km || 
|-id=575 bgcolor=#E9E9E9
| 338575 ||  || — || September 20, 2003 || Palomar || NEAT || — || align=right | 2.6 km || 
|-id=576 bgcolor=#E9E9E9
| 338576 ||  || — || September 20, 2003 || Palomar || NEAT || — || align=right | 3.0 km || 
|-id=577 bgcolor=#E9E9E9
| 338577 ||  || — || September 17, 2003 || Socorro || LINEAR || — || align=right | 2.7 km || 
|-id=578 bgcolor=#E9E9E9
| 338578 ||  || — || September 20, 2003 || Piszkéstető || K. Sárneczky, B. Sipőcz || WIT || align=right data-sort-value="0.82" | 820 m || 
|-id=579 bgcolor=#E9E9E9
| 338579 ||  || — || September 18, 2003 || Goodricke-Pigott || R. A. Tucker || 526 || align=right | 3.9 km || 
|-id=580 bgcolor=#E9E9E9
| 338580 ||  || — || September 17, 2003 || Socorro || LINEAR || — || align=right | 4.0 km || 
|-id=581 bgcolor=#E9E9E9
| 338581 ||  || — || September 17, 2003 || Kitt Peak || Spacewatch || — || align=right | 1.7 km || 
|-id=582 bgcolor=#E9E9E9
| 338582 ||  || — || September 19, 2003 || Palomar || NEAT || WIT || align=right | 1.2 km || 
|-id=583 bgcolor=#E9E9E9
| 338583 ||  || — || September 19, 2003 || Haleakala || NEAT || — || align=right | 2.6 km || 
|-id=584 bgcolor=#E9E9E9
| 338584 ||  || — || September 18, 2003 || Socorro || LINEAR || BRU || align=right | 5.0 km || 
|-id=585 bgcolor=#E9E9E9
| 338585 ||  || — || September 18, 2003 || Palomar || NEAT || — || align=right | 2.0 km || 
|-id=586 bgcolor=#E9E9E9
| 338586 ||  || — || September 18, 2003 || Kitt Peak || Spacewatch || — || align=right | 2.9 km || 
|-id=587 bgcolor=#E9E9E9
| 338587 ||  || — || September 20, 2003 || Haleakala || NEAT || — || align=right | 3.8 km || 
|-id=588 bgcolor=#E9E9E9
| 338588 ||  || — || September 21, 2003 || Socorro || LINEAR || — || align=right | 1.7 km || 
|-id=589 bgcolor=#E9E9E9
| 338589 ||  || — || September 19, 2003 || Palomar || NEAT || — || align=right | 2.5 km || 
|-id=590 bgcolor=#E9E9E9
| 338590 ||  || — || September 20, 2003 || Palomar || NEAT || — || align=right | 3.9 km || 
|-id=591 bgcolor=#E9E9E9
| 338591 ||  || — || September 20, 2003 || Palomar || NEAT || — || align=right | 2.2 km || 
|-id=592 bgcolor=#E9E9E9
| 338592 ||  || — || September 16, 2003 || Socorro || LINEAR || — || align=right | 2.2 km || 
|-id=593 bgcolor=#E9E9E9
| 338593 ||  || — || September 17, 2003 || Socorro || LINEAR || — || align=right | 2.9 km || 
|-id=594 bgcolor=#E9E9E9
| 338594 ||  || — || September 17, 2003 || Socorro || LINEAR || — || align=right | 2.8 km || 
|-id=595 bgcolor=#E9E9E9
| 338595 ||  || — || September 17, 2003 || Socorro || LINEAR || — || align=right | 3.2 km || 
|-id=596 bgcolor=#E9E9E9
| 338596 ||  || — || September 19, 2003 || Anderson Mesa || LONEOS || — || align=right | 2.4 km || 
|-id=597 bgcolor=#E9E9E9
| 338597 ||  || — || September 19, 2003 || Kitt Peak || Spacewatch || — || align=right | 1.8 km || 
|-id=598 bgcolor=#E9E9E9
| 338598 ||  || — || September 20, 2003 || Črni Vrh || Črni Vrh || — || align=right | 2.6 km || 
|-id=599 bgcolor=#E9E9E9
| 338599 ||  || — || September 23, 2003 || Haleakala || NEAT || EUN || align=right | 1.7 km || 
|-id=600 bgcolor=#E9E9E9
| 338600 ||  || — || September 21, 2003 || Uccle || T. Pauwels || — || align=right | 1.9 km || 
|}

338601–338700 

|-bgcolor=#E9E9E9
| 338601 ||  || — || September 18, 2003 || Palomar || NEAT || — || align=right | 2.6 km || 
|-id=602 bgcolor=#E9E9E9
| 338602 ||  || — || September 18, 2003 || Kitt Peak || Spacewatch || — || align=right | 2.1 km || 
|-id=603 bgcolor=#E9E9E9
| 338603 ||  || — || September 19, 2003 || Haleakala || NEAT || — || align=right | 2.2 km || 
|-id=604 bgcolor=#E9E9E9
| 338604 ||  || — || September 21, 2003 || Socorro || LINEAR || — || align=right | 3.4 km || 
|-id=605 bgcolor=#E9E9E9
| 338605 ||  || — || September 21, 2003 || Kitt Peak || Spacewatch || — || align=right | 2.8 km || 
|-id=606 bgcolor=#E9E9E9
| 338606 ||  || — || September 22, 2003 || Kitt Peak || Spacewatch || — || align=right | 2.7 km || 
|-id=607 bgcolor=#E9E9E9
| 338607 ||  || — || September 23, 2003 || Palomar || NEAT || — || align=right | 1.8 km || 
|-id=608 bgcolor=#E9E9E9
| 338608 ||  || — || September 21, 2003 || Anderson Mesa || LONEOS || — || align=right | 2.3 km || 
|-id=609 bgcolor=#E9E9E9
| 338609 ||  || — || September 21, 2003 || Anderson Mesa || LONEOS || — || align=right | 3.6 km || 
|-id=610 bgcolor=#E9E9E9
| 338610 ||  || — || September 21, 2003 || Anderson Mesa || LONEOS || — || align=right | 3.6 km || 
|-id=611 bgcolor=#E9E9E9
| 338611 ||  || — || September 22, 2003 || Anderson Mesa || LONEOS || — || align=right | 2.1 km || 
|-id=612 bgcolor=#E9E9E9
| 338612 ||  || — || September 21, 2003 || Palomar || NEAT || — || align=right | 1.9 km || 
|-id=613 bgcolor=#E9E9E9
| 338613 ||  || — || September 24, 2003 || Kvistaberg || UDAS || — || align=right | 2.1 km || 
|-id=614 bgcolor=#E9E9E9
| 338614 ||  || — || September 24, 2003 || Palomar || NEAT || — || align=right | 2.2 km || 
|-id=615 bgcolor=#E9E9E9
| 338615 ||  || — || September 25, 2003 || Palomar || NEAT || — || align=right | 3.0 km || 
|-id=616 bgcolor=#E9E9E9
| 338616 ||  || — || September 28, 2003 || Desert Eagle || W. K. Y. Yeung || — || align=right | 2.1 km || 
|-id=617 bgcolor=#E9E9E9
| 338617 ||  || — || September 26, 2003 || Desert Eagle || W. K. Y. Yeung || — || align=right | 2.3 km || 
|-id=618 bgcolor=#E9E9E9
| 338618 ||  || — || September 26, 2003 || Socorro || LINEAR || — || align=right | 3.1 km || 
|-id=619 bgcolor=#E9E9E9
| 338619 ||  || — || September 27, 2003 || Kitt Peak || Spacewatch || — || align=right | 2.2 km || 
|-id=620 bgcolor=#E9E9E9
| 338620 ||  || — || September 17, 2003 || Kitt Peak || Spacewatch || — || align=right | 2.5 km || 
|-id=621 bgcolor=#E9E9E9
| 338621 ||  || — || September 27, 2003 || Kitt Peak || Spacewatch || — || align=right | 2.4 km || 
|-id=622 bgcolor=#E9E9E9
| 338622 ||  || — || September 26, 2003 || Socorro || LINEAR || — || align=right | 2.9 km || 
|-id=623 bgcolor=#E9E9E9
| 338623 ||  || — || September 26, 2003 || Socorro || LINEAR || — || align=right | 2.7 km || 
|-id=624 bgcolor=#E9E9E9
| 338624 ||  || — || September 27, 2003 || Kitt Peak || Spacewatch || — || align=right | 2.8 km || 
|-id=625 bgcolor=#E9E9E9
| 338625 ||  || — || September 27, 2003 || Kitt Peak || Spacewatch || — || align=right | 1.2 km || 
|-id=626 bgcolor=#E9E9E9
| 338626 ||  || — || September 27, 2003 || Socorro || LINEAR || INO || align=right | 1.5 km || 
|-id=627 bgcolor=#E9E9E9
| 338627 ||  || — || September 27, 2003 || Socorro || LINEAR || — || align=right | 2.6 km || 
|-id=628 bgcolor=#E9E9E9
| 338628 ||  || — || September 28, 2003 || Socorro || LINEAR || AEO || align=right | 1.6 km || 
|-id=629 bgcolor=#E9E9E9
| 338629 ||  || — || September 25, 2003 || Haleakala || NEAT || GEF || align=right | 1.4 km || 
|-id=630 bgcolor=#E9E9E9
| 338630 ||  || — || September 27, 2003 || Socorro || LINEAR || — || align=right | 2.3 km || 
|-id=631 bgcolor=#E9E9E9
| 338631 ||  || — || September 30, 2003 || Socorro || LINEAR || — || align=right | 3.6 km || 
|-id=632 bgcolor=#E9E9E9
| 338632 ||  || — || September 30, 2003 || Socorro || LINEAR || GEF || align=right | 1.6 km || 
|-id=633 bgcolor=#E9E9E9
| 338633 ||  || — || September 30, 2003 || Socorro || LINEAR || JUN || align=right | 3.8 km || 
|-id=634 bgcolor=#E9E9E9
| 338634 ||  || — || September 20, 2003 || Socorro || LINEAR || — || align=right | 2.7 km || 
|-id=635 bgcolor=#E9E9E9
| 338635 ||  || — || September 20, 2003 || Socorro || LINEAR || — || align=right | 2.5 km || 
|-id=636 bgcolor=#E9E9E9
| 338636 ||  || — || September 28, 2003 || Socorro || LINEAR || — || align=right | 2.0 km || 
|-id=637 bgcolor=#E9E9E9
| 338637 ||  || — || September 29, 2003 || Anderson Mesa || LONEOS || — || align=right | 3.3 km || 
|-id=638 bgcolor=#E9E9E9
| 338638 ||  || — || September 18, 2003 || Haleakala || NEAT || — || align=right | 2.6 km || 
|-id=639 bgcolor=#E9E9E9
| 338639 ||  || — || September 18, 2003 || Haleakala || NEAT || — || align=right | 2.8 km || 
|-id=640 bgcolor=#E9E9E9
| 338640 ||  || — || September 17, 2003 || Palomar || NEAT || — || align=right | 2.8 km || 
|-id=641 bgcolor=#E9E9E9
| 338641 ||  || — || September 17, 2003 || Palomar || NEAT || — || align=right | 2.1 km || 
|-id=642 bgcolor=#E9E9E9
| 338642 ||  || — || September 17, 2003 || Palomar || NEAT || — || align=right | 2.7 km || 
|-id=643 bgcolor=#E9E9E9
| 338643 ||  || — || September 30, 2003 || Socorro || LINEAR || — || align=right | 1.9 km || 
|-id=644 bgcolor=#E9E9E9
| 338644 ||  || — || September 28, 2003 || Kitt Peak || Spacewatch || — || align=right | 2.9 km || 
|-id=645 bgcolor=#E9E9E9
| 338645 ||  || — || September 29, 2003 || Anderson Mesa || LONEOS || MAR || align=right | 1.8 km || 
|-id=646 bgcolor=#E9E9E9
| 338646 ||  || — || September 27, 2003 || Socorro || LINEAR || — || align=right | 2.2 km || 
|-id=647 bgcolor=#E9E9E9
| 338647 ||  || — || September 17, 2003 || Kitt Peak || Spacewatch || — || align=right | 2.6 km || 
|-id=648 bgcolor=#E9E9E9
| 338648 ||  || — || September 17, 2003 || Kitt Peak || Spacewatch || — || align=right | 2.4 km || 
|-id=649 bgcolor=#E9E9E9
| 338649 ||  || — || September 18, 2003 || Kitt Peak || Spacewatch || — || align=right | 2.0 km || 
|-id=650 bgcolor=#E9E9E9
| 338650 ||  || — || September 22, 2003 || Palomar || NEAT || NEM || align=right | 3.4 km || 
|-id=651 bgcolor=#E9E9E9
| 338651 ||  || — || September 26, 2003 || Apache Point || SDSS || — || align=right | 1.9 km || 
|-id=652 bgcolor=#E9E9E9
| 338652 ||  || — || September 26, 2003 || Apache Point || SDSS || — || align=right | 1.3 km || 
|-id=653 bgcolor=#E9E9E9
| 338653 ||  || — || September 26, 2003 || Apache Point || SDSS || — || align=right | 3.2 km || 
|-id=654 bgcolor=#E9E9E9
| 338654 ||  || — || September 30, 2003 || Kitt Peak || Spacewatch || WIT || align=right | 1.1 km || 
|-id=655 bgcolor=#E9E9E9
| 338655 ||  || — || September 22, 2003 || Kitt Peak || Spacewatch || — || align=right | 2.6 km || 
|-id=656 bgcolor=#E9E9E9
| 338656 ||  || — || September 26, 2003 || Apache Point || SDSS || — || align=right | 2.0 km || 
|-id=657 bgcolor=#E9E9E9
| 338657 ||  || — || September 16, 2003 || Kitt Peak || Spacewatch || — || align=right | 2.1 km || 
|-id=658 bgcolor=#E9E9E9
| 338658 ||  || — || September 17, 2003 || Kitt Peak || Spacewatch || HEN || align=right | 1.1 km || 
|-id=659 bgcolor=#E9E9E9
| 338659 ||  || — || April 10, 2002 || Socorro || LINEAR || — || align=right | 1.9 km || 
|-id=660 bgcolor=#E9E9E9
| 338660 ||  || — || September 18, 2003 || Kitt Peak || Spacewatch || HEN || align=right | 1.1 km || 
|-id=661 bgcolor=#E9E9E9
| 338661 ||  || — || September 18, 2003 || Kitt Peak || Spacewatch || — || align=right | 1.9 km || 
|-id=662 bgcolor=#E9E9E9
| 338662 ||  || — || September 18, 2003 || Palomar || NEAT || MRX || align=right | 1.3 km || 
|-id=663 bgcolor=#E9E9E9
| 338663 ||  || — || September 20, 2003 || Kitt Peak || Spacewatch || — || align=right | 2.4 km || 
|-id=664 bgcolor=#E9E9E9
| 338664 ||  || — || September 22, 2003 || Anderson Mesa || LONEOS || — || align=right | 1.7 km || 
|-id=665 bgcolor=#E9E9E9
| 338665 ||  || — || February 16, 2001 || Kitt Peak || Spacewatch || — || align=right | 3.3 km || 
|-id=666 bgcolor=#E9E9E9
| 338666 ||  || — || September 21, 2003 || Kitt Peak || Spacewatch || PAD || align=right | 1.7 km || 
|-id=667 bgcolor=#E9E9E9
| 338667 ||  || — || September 22, 2003 || Kitt Peak || Spacewatch || — || align=right | 2.5 km || 
|-id=668 bgcolor=#E9E9E9
| 338668 ||  || — || September 26, 2003 || Apache Point || SDSS || — || align=right | 1.6 km || 
|-id=669 bgcolor=#E9E9E9
| 338669 ||  || — || September 26, 2003 || Apache Point || SDSS || NEM || align=right | 2.4 km || 
|-id=670 bgcolor=#E9E9E9
| 338670 ||  || — || September 26, 2003 || Apache Point || SDSS || — || align=right | 1.6 km || 
|-id=671 bgcolor=#E9E9E9
| 338671 ||  || — || September 26, 2003 || Apache Point || SDSS || NEM || align=right | 2.5 km || 
|-id=672 bgcolor=#E9E9E9
| 338672 ||  || — || September 30, 2003 || Kitt Peak || Spacewatch || — || align=right | 1.8 km || 
|-id=673 bgcolor=#E9E9E9
| 338673 ||  || — || September 21, 2003 || Anderson Mesa || LONEOS || INO || align=right | 1.4 km || 
|-id=674 bgcolor=#E9E9E9
| 338674 ||  || — || September 25, 2003 || Palomar || NEAT || PAE || align=right | 3.4 km || 
|-id=675 bgcolor=#E9E9E9
| 338675 ||  || — || September 28, 2003 || Kitt Peak || Spacewatch || AST || align=right | 2.0 km || 
|-id=676 bgcolor=#E9E9E9
| 338676 ||  || — || September 19, 2003 || Anderson Mesa || LONEOS || — || align=right | 2.0 km || 
|-id=677 bgcolor=#E9E9E9
| 338677 ||  || — || October 1, 2003 || Kitt Peak || Spacewatch || — || align=right | 2.4 km || 
|-id=678 bgcolor=#E9E9E9
| 338678 ||  || — || October 1, 2003 || Kitt Peak || Spacewatch || NEM || align=right | 2.3 km || 
|-id=679 bgcolor=#E9E9E9
| 338679 ||  || — || October 2, 2003 || Haleakala || NEAT || EUN || align=right | 1.7 km || 
|-id=680 bgcolor=#E9E9E9
| 338680 ||  || — || October 2, 2003 || Socorro || LINEAR || — || align=right | 3.3 km || 
|-id=681 bgcolor=#E9E9E9
| 338681 ||  || — || October 14, 2003 || Palomar || NEAT || — || align=right | 3.0 km || 
|-id=682 bgcolor=#E9E9E9
| 338682 ||  || — || October 15, 2003 || Palomar || NEAT || PAD || align=right | 3.6 km || 
|-id=683 bgcolor=#E9E9E9
| 338683 ||  || — || October 15, 2003 || Palomar || NEAT || — || align=right | 2.6 km || 
|-id=684 bgcolor=#E9E9E9
| 338684 ||  || — || October 1, 2003 || Kitt Peak || Spacewatch || AST || align=right | 1.6 km || 
|-id=685 bgcolor=#E9E9E9
| 338685 ||  || — || October 1, 2003 || Kitt Peak || Spacewatch || — || align=right | 1.7 km || 
|-id=686 bgcolor=#E9E9E9
| 338686 ||  || — || October 1, 2003 || Kitt Peak || Spacewatch || HOF || align=right | 2.2 km || 
|-id=687 bgcolor=#E9E9E9
| 338687 ||  || — || October 2, 2003 || Kitt Peak || Spacewatch || — || align=right | 1.9 km || 
|-id=688 bgcolor=#E9E9E9
| 338688 ||  || — || October 2, 2003 || Kitt Peak || Spacewatch || WIT || align=right | 1.0 km || 
|-id=689 bgcolor=#E9E9E9
| 338689 ||  || — || October 3, 2003 || Kitt Peak || Spacewatch || — || align=right | 2.7 km || 
|-id=690 bgcolor=#E9E9E9
| 338690 ||  || — || October 5, 2003 || Kitt Peak || Spacewatch || GEF || align=right | 1.4 km || 
|-id=691 bgcolor=#E9E9E9
| 338691 ||  || — || October 1, 2003 || Anderson Mesa || LONEOS || — || align=right | 2.6 km || 
|-id=692 bgcolor=#E9E9E9
| 338692 ||  || — || October 18, 2003 || Palomar || NEAT || — || align=right | 3.7 km || 
|-id=693 bgcolor=#E9E9E9
| 338693 ||  || — || October 18, 2003 || Kingsnake || J. V. McClusky || — || align=right | 1.6 km || 
|-id=694 bgcolor=#E9E9E9
| 338694 ||  || — || October 19, 2003 || Socorro || LINEAR || JUN || align=right | 1.4 km || 
|-id=695 bgcolor=#E9E9E9
| 338695 ||  || — || October 16, 2003 || Palomar || NEAT || — || align=right | 2.1 km || 
|-id=696 bgcolor=#E9E9E9
| 338696 ||  || — || October 16, 2003 || Anderson Mesa || LONEOS || — || align=right | 2.8 km || 
|-id=697 bgcolor=#E9E9E9
| 338697 ||  || — || October 20, 2003 || Nashville || R. Clingan || — || align=right | 2.6 km || 
|-id=698 bgcolor=#FA8072
| 338698 ||  || — || October 21, 2003 || Socorro || LINEAR || — || align=right data-sort-value="0.51" | 510 m || 
|-id=699 bgcolor=#E9E9E9
| 338699 ||  || — || October 20, 2003 || Kingsnake || J. V. McClusky || — || align=right | 3.1 km || 
|-id=700 bgcolor=#E9E9E9
| 338700 ||  || — || October 16, 2003 || Kitt Peak || Spacewatch || — || align=right | 2.3 km || 
|}

338701–338800 

|-bgcolor=#E9E9E9
| 338701 ||  || — || October 16, 2003 || Kitt Peak || Spacewatch || JUN || align=right | 1.5 km || 
|-id=702 bgcolor=#E9E9E9
| 338702 ||  || — || October 17, 2003 || Kitt Peak || Spacewatch || — || align=right | 1.2 km || 
|-id=703 bgcolor=#E9E9E9
| 338703 ||  || — || October 17, 2003 || Kitt Peak || Spacewatch || INO || align=right | 1.6 km || 
|-id=704 bgcolor=#E9E9E9
| 338704 ||  || — || October 18, 2003 || Kitt Peak || Spacewatch || — || align=right | 2.6 km || 
|-id=705 bgcolor=#E9E9E9
| 338705 ||  || — || September 29, 2003 || Kitt Peak || Spacewatch || — || align=right | 1.6 km || 
|-id=706 bgcolor=#E9E9E9
| 338706 ||  || — || October 18, 2003 || Palomar || NEAT || — || align=right | 3.2 km || 
|-id=707 bgcolor=#E9E9E9
| 338707 ||  || — || October 18, 2003 || Palomar || NEAT || — || align=right | 2.4 km || 
|-id=708 bgcolor=#E9E9E9
| 338708 ||  || — || October 18, 2003 || Palomar || NEAT || — || align=right | 2.0 km || 
|-id=709 bgcolor=#E9E9E9
| 338709 ||  || — || October 23, 2003 || Kitt Peak || Spacewatch || XIZ || align=right | 1.8 km || 
|-id=710 bgcolor=#E9E9E9
| 338710 ||  || — || October 16, 2003 || Palomar || NEAT || — || align=right | 3.2 km || 
|-id=711 bgcolor=#E9E9E9
| 338711 ||  || — || October 17, 2003 || Anderson Mesa || LONEOS || — || align=right | 2.6 km || 
|-id=712 bgcolor=#E9E9E9
| 338712 ||  || — || October 16, 2003 || Anderson Mesa || LONEOS || INO || align=right | 1.5 km || 
|-id=713 bgcolor=#E9E9E9
| 338713 ||  || — || October 16, 2003 || Kitt Peak || Spacewatch || — || align=right | 2.0 km || 
|-id=714 bgcolor=#E9E9E9
| 338714 ||  || — || October 18, 2003 || Kitt Peak || Spacewatch || — || align=right | 2.1 km || 
|-id=715 bgcolor=#E9E9E9
| 338715 ||  || — || October 17, 2003 || Anderson Mesa || LONEOS || — || align=right | 3.1 km || 
|-id=716 bgcolor=#E9E9E9
| 338716 ||  || — || October 17, 2003 || Anderson Mesa || LONEOS || — || align=right | 3.6 km || 
|-id=717 bgcolor=#E9E9E9
| 338717 ||  || — || October 17, 2003 || Anderson Mesa || LONEOS || — || align=right | 3.3 km || 
|-id=718 bgcolor=#E9E9E9
| 338718 ||  || — || October 19, 2003 || Haleakala || NEAT || — || align=right | 3.6 km || 
|-id=719 bgcolor=#E9E9E9
| 338719 ||  || — || October 16, 2003 || Anderson Mesa || LONEOS || — || align=right | 3.7 km || 
|-id=720 bgcolor=#E9E9E9
| 338720 ||  || — || October 17, 2003 || Anderson Mesa || LONEOS || — || align=right | 2.9 km || 
|-id=721 bgcolor=#E9E9E9
| 338721 ||  || — || September 28, 2003 || Kitt Peak || Spacewatch || AGN || align=right | 1.3 km || 
|-id=722 bgcolor=#E9E9E9
| 338722 ||  || — || October 19, 2003 || Anderson Mesa || LONEOS || — || align=right | 3.3 km || 
|-id=723 bgcolor=#E9E9E9
| 338723 ||  || — || October 17, 2003 || Kitt Peak || Spacewatch || — || align=right | 2.2 km || 
|-id=724 bgcolor=#E9E9E9
| 338724 ||  || — || October 18, 2003 || Kitt Peak || Spacewatch || — || align=right | 3.1 km || 
|-id=725 bgcolor=#E9E9E9
| 338725 ||  || — || October 19, 2003 || Palomar || NEAT || — || align=right | 3.3 km || 
|-id=726 bgcolor=#E9E9E9
| 338726 ||  || — || October 17, 2003 || Anderson Mesa || LONEOS || — || align=right | 2.3 km || 
|-id=727 bgcolor=#E9E9E9
| 338727 ||  || — || October 19, 2003 || Palomar || NEAT || — || align=right | 3.7 km || 
|-id=728 bgcolor=#E9E9E9
| 338728 ||  || — || October 19, 2003 || Kitt Peak || Spacewatch || — || align=right | 2.1 km || 
|-id=729 bgcolor=#E9E9E9
| 338729 ||  || — || October 20, 2003 || Kitt Peak || Spacewatch || — || align=right | 2.0 km || 
|-id=730 bgcolor=#E9E9E9
| 338730 ||  || — || October 20, 2003 || Socorro || LINEAR || — || align=right | 2.9 km || 
|-id=731 bgcolor=#E9E9E9
| 338731 ||  || — || October 21, 2003 || Socorro || LINEAR || — || align=right | 2.4 km || 
|-id=732 bgcolor=#E9E9E9
| 338732 ||  || — || September 14, 1998 || Kitt Peak || Spacewatch || HOF || align=right | 2.3 km || 
|-id=733 bgcolor=#E9E9E9
| 338733 ||  || — || October 17, 2003 || Kitt Peak || Spacewatch || MRX || align=right | 1.2 km || 
|-id=734 bgcolor=#E9E9E9
| 338734 ||  || — || October 18, 2003 || Kitt Peak || Spacewatch || — || align=right | 3.6 km || 
|-id=735 bgcolor=#E9E9E9
| 338735 ||  || — || October 20, 2003 || Socorro || LINEAR || — || align=right | 2.8 km || 
|-id=736 bgcolor=#E9E9E9
| 338736 ||  || — || October 21, 2003 || Kitt Peak || Spacewatch || — || align=right | 2.3 km || 
|-id=737 bgcolor=#E9E9E9
| 338737 ||  || — || October 21, 2003 || Socorro || LINEAR || JUN || align=right | 1.6 km || 
|-id=738 bgcolor=#E9E9E9
| 338738 ||  || — || October 16, 2003 || Palomar || NEAT || — || align=right | 3.0 km || 
|-id=739 bgcolor=#E9E9E9
| 338739 ||  || — || October 18, 2003 || Anderson Mesa || LONEOS || — || align=right | 3.0 km || 
|-id=740 bgcolor=#E9E9E9
| 338740 ||  || — || October 19, 2003 || Palomar || NEAT || — || align=right | 2.1 km || 
|-id=741 bgcolor=#E9E9E9
| 338741 ||  || — || October 20, 2003 || Kitt Peak || Spacewatch || — || align=right | 2.2 km || 
|-id=742 bgcolor=#E9E9E9
| 338742 ||  || — || October 20, 2003 || Kitt Peak || Spacewatch || — || align=right | 2.7 km || 
|-id=743 bgcolor=#E9E9E9
| 338743 ||  || — || October 2, 2003 || Kitt Peak || Spacewatch || — || align=right | 2.7 km || 
|-id=744 bgcolor=#E9E9E9
| 338744 ||  || — || October 21, 2003 || Kitt Peak || Spacewatch || — || align=right | 3.1 km || 
|-id=745 bgcolor=#E9E9E9
| 338745 ||  || — || September 20, 2003 || Socorro || LINEAR || INO || align=right | 1.6 km || 
|-id=746 bgcolor=#E9E9E9
| 338746 ||  || — || October 21, 2003 || Kitt Peak || Spacewatch || — || align=right | 2.8 km || 
|-id=747 bgcolor=#E9E9E9
| 338747 ||  || — || October 21, 2003 || Kitt Peak || Spacewatch || PAD || align=right | 3.6 km || 
|-id=748 bgcolor=#E9E9E9
| 338748 ||  || — || October 22, 2003 || Socorro || LINEAR || — || align=right | 2.9 km || 
|-id=749 bgcolor=#E9E9E9
| 338749 ||  || — || October 22, 2003 || Socorro || LINEAR || — || align=right | 2.9 km || 
|-id=750 bgcolor=#E9E9E9
| 338750 ||  || — || October 22, 2003 || Kitt Peak || Spacewatch || WIT || align=right | 1.4 km || 
|-id=751 bgcolor=#E9E9E9
| 338751 ||  || — || October 22, 2003 || Kitt Peak || Spacewatch || — || align=right | 3.5 km || 
|-id=752 bgcolor=#E9E9E9
| 338752 ||  || — || October 21, 2003 || Kitt Peak || Spacewatch || — || align=right | 3.2 km || 
|-id=753 bgcolor=#E9E9E9
| 338753 ||  || — || October 21, 2003 || Palomar || NEAT || — || align=right | 2.8 km || 
|-id=754 bgcolor=#E9E9E9
| 338754 ||  || — || October 21, 2003 || Palomar || NEAT || — || align=right | 3.7 km || 
|-id=755 bgcolor=#E9E9E9
| 338755 ||  || — || October 22, 2003 || Palomar || NEAT || — || align=right | 3.8 km || 
|-id=756 bgcolor=#E9E9E9
| 338756 ||  || — || October 22, 2003 || Kitt Peak || Spacewatch || GEF || align=right | 1.5 km || 
|-id=757 bgcolor=#E9E9E9
| 338757 ||  || — || October 22, 2003 || Kitt Peak || Spacewatch || WIT || align=right | 1.3 km || 
|-id=758 bgcolor=#E9E9E9
| 338758 ||  || — || August 25, 1998 || Caussols || ODAS || — || align=right | 2.3 km || 
|-id=759 bgcolor=#E9E9E9
| 338759 ||  || — || October 21, 2003 || Anderson Mesa || LONEOS || — || align=right | 3.0 km || 
|-id=760 bgcolor=#E9E9E9
| 338760 ||  || — || October 22, 2003 || Socorro || LINEAR || — || align=right | 3.0 km || 
|-id=761 bgcolor=#E9E9E9
| 338761 ||  || — || October 23, 2003 || Kitt Peak || Spacewatch || — || align=right | 1.9 km || 
|-id=762 bgcolor=#E9E9E9
| 338762 ||  || — || October 21, 2003 || Socorro || LINEAR || — || align=right | 2.8 km || 
|-id=763 bgcolor=#E9E9E9
| 338763 ||  || — || October 23, 2003 || Anderson Mesa || LONEOS || ADE || align=right | 5.0 km || 
|-id=764 bgcolor=#E9E9E9
| 338764 ||  || — || October 24, 2003 || Socorro || LINEAR || — || align=right | 2.3 km || 
|-id=765 bgcolor=#E9E9E9
| 338765 ||  || — || October 24, 2003 || Socorro || LINEAR || — || align=right | 3.2 km || 
|-id=766 bgcolor=#E9E9E9
| 338766 ||  || — || October 24, 2003 || Socorro || LINEAR || — || align=right | 2.7 km || 
|-id=767 bgcolor=#E9E9E9
| 338767 ||  || — || October 25, 2003 || Socorro || LINEAR || — || align=right | 2.7 km || 
|-id=768 bgcolor=#E9E9E9
| 338768 ||  || — || October 25, 2003 || Socorro || LINEAR || — || align=right | 1.6 km || 
|-id=769 bgcolor=#E9E9E9
| 338769 ||  || — || October 25, 2003 || Socorro || LINEAR || — || align=right | 4.1 km || 
|-id=770 bgcolor=#E9E9E9
| 338770 ||  || — || October 25, 2003 || Socorro || LINEAR || GEF || align=right | 1.5 km || 
|-id=771 bgcolor=#E9E9E9
| 338771 ||  || — || October 25, 2003 || Socorro || LINEAR || — || align=right | 3.0 km || 
|-id=772 bgcolor=#E9E9E9
| 338772 ||  || — || October 25, 2003 || Kvistaberg || UDAS || WIT || align=right | 1.1 km || 
|-id=773 bgcolor=#E9E9E9
| 338773 ||  || — || October 24, 2003 || Kitt Peak || Spacewatch || NEM || align=right | 2.6 km || 
|-id=774 bgcolor=#E9E9E9
| 338774 ||  || — || October 25, 2003 || Kitt Peak || Spacewatch || AEO || align=right | 1.3 km || 
|-id=775 bgcolor=#E9E9E9
| 338775 ||  || — || October 16, 2003 || Anderson Mesa || LONEOS || DOR || align=right | 3.1 km || 
|-id=776 bgcolor=#E9E9E9
| 338776 ||  || — || October 24, 2003 || Bergisch Gladbac || W. Bickel || NEM || align=right | 2.3 km || 
|-id=777 bgcolor=#E9E9E9
| 338777 ||  || — || October 28, 2003 || Socorro || LINEAR || HNA || align=right | 2.9 km || 
|-id=778 bgcolor=#E9E9E9
| 338778 ||  || — || October 29, 2003 || Kitt Peak || Spacewatch || AEO || align=right | 1.5 km || 
|-id=779 bgcolor=#E9E9E9
| 338779 ||  || — || October 27, 2003 || Socorro || LINEAR || — || align=right | 3.3 km || 
|-id=780 bgcolor=#E9E9E9
| 338780 ||  || — || October 22, 2003 || Kitt Peak || M. W. Buie || — || align=right | 2.1 km || 
|-id=781 bgcolor=#E9E9E9
| 338781 ||  || — || October 18, 2003 || Socorro || LINEAR || — || align=right | 3.5 km || 
|-id=782 bgcolor=#E9E9E9
| 338782 ||  || — || October 16, 2003 || Kitt Peak || Spacewatch || — || align=right | 2.0 km || 
|-id=783 bgcolor=#E9E9E9
| 338783 ||  || — || October 16, 2003 || Kitt Peak || Spacewatch || NEM || align=right | 2.6 km || 
|-id=784 bgcolor=#E9E9E9
| 338784 ||  || — || October 16, 2003 || Kitt Peak || Spacewatch || — || align=right | 2.3 km || 
|-id=785 bgcolor=#E9E9E9
| 338785 ||  || — || September 27, 2003 || Kitt Peak || Spacewatch || — || align=right | 2.1 km || 
|-id=786 bgcolor=#E9E9E9
| 338786 ||  || — || October 18, 2003 || Kitt Peak || Spacewatch || — || align=right | 2.9 km || 
|-id=787 bgcolor=#E9E9E9
| 338787 ||  || — || October 18, 2003 || Kitt Peak || Spacewatch || INO || align=right | 1.3 km || 
|-id=788 bgcolor=#E9E9E9
| 338788 ||  || — || October 19, 2003 || Kitt Peak || Spacewatch || — || align=right | 3.0 km || 
|-id=789 bgcolor=#E9E9E9
| 338789 ||  || — || October 18, 2003 || Apache Point || SDSS || — || align=right | 1.5 km || 
|-id=790 bgcolor=#E9E9E9
| 338790 ||  || — || October 18, 2003 || Apache Point || SDSS || WIT || align=right data-sort-value="0.90" | 900 m || 
|-id=791 bgcolor=#d6d6d6
| 338791 ||  || — || October 18, 2003 || Apache Point || SDSS || EOS || align=right | 2.6 km || 
|-id=792 bgcolor=#E9E9E9
| 338792 ||  || — || October 18, 2003 || Kitt Peak || Spacewatch || AST || align=right | 1.5 km || 
|-id=793 bgcolor=#E9E9E9
| 338793 ||  || — || October 19, 2003 || Apache Point || SDSS || — || align=right | 1.7 km || 
|-id=794 bgcolor=#E9E9E9
| 338794 ||  || — || October 19, 2003 || Apache Point || SDSS || MRX || align=right | 1.1 km || 
|-id=795 bgcolor=#E9E9E9
| 338795 ||  || — || October 19, 2003 || Apache Point || SDSS || — || align=right | 1.5 km || 
|-id=796 bgcolor=#E9E9E9
| 338796 ||  || — || October 19, 2003 || Kitt Peak || Spacewatch || — || align=right | 2.8 km || 
|-id=797 bgcolor=#E9E9E9
| 338797 ||  || — || October 22, 2003 || Apache Point || SDSS || NEM || align=right | 2.5 km || 
|-id=798 bgcolor=#E9E9E9
| 338798 ||  || — || October 22, 2003 || Apache Point || SDSS || — || align=right | 1.9 km || 
|-id=799 bgcolor=#d6d6d6
| 338799 ||  || — || October 22, 2003 || Apache Point || SDSS || EOS || align=right | 2.3 km || 
|-id=800 bgcolor=#E9E9E9
| 338800 ||  || — || October 23, 2003 || Apache Point || SDSS || JUN || align=right | 1.2 km || 
|}

338801–338900 

|-bgcolor=#E9E9E9
| 338801 ||  || — || October 23, 2003 || Apache Point || SDSS || — || align=right | 1.7 km || 
|-id=802 bgcolor=#E9E9E9
| 338802 ||  || — || October 23, 2003 || Apache Point || SDSS || — || align=right | 1.5 km || 
|-id=803 bgcolor=#E9E9E9
| 338803 ||  || — || October 16, 2003 || Anderson Mesa || LONEOS || EUN || align=right | 1.6 km || 
|-id=804 bgcolor=#E9E9E9
| 338804 ||  || — || November 15, 2003 || Kitt Peak || Spacewatch || — || align=right | 2.7 km || 
|-id=805 bgcolor=#E9E9E9
| 338805 ||  || — || November 15, 2003 || Kitt Peak || Spacewatch || — || align=right | 3.3 km || 
|-id=806 bgcolor=#E9E9E9
| 338806 ||  || — || November 16, 2003 || Kitt Peak || Spacewatch || — || align=right | 2.7 km || 
|-id=807 bgcolor=#E9E9E9
| 338807 ||  || — || November 18, 2003 || Kitt Peak || Spacewatch || DOR || align=right | 2.6 km || 
|-id=808 bgcolor=#FA8072
| 338808 ||  || — || November 19, 2003 || Socorro || LINEAR || — || align=right | 3.6 km || 
|-id=809 bgcolor=#d6d6d6
| 338809 ||  || — || November 16, 2003 || Kitt Peak || Spacewatch || SAN || align=right | 3.1 km || 
|-id=810 bgcolor=#E9E9E9
| 338810 ||  || — || November 16, 2003 || Kitt Peak || Spacewatch || HEN || align=right | 1.1 km || 
|-id=811 bgcolor=#E9E9E9
| 338811 ||  || — || November 18, 2003 || Palomar || NEAT || CLO || align=right | 2.6 km || 
|-id=812 bgcolor=#E9E9E9
| 338812 ||  || — || November 19, 2003 || Socorro || LINEAR || DOR || align=right | 2.5 km || 
|-id=813 bgcolor=#E9E9E9
| 338813 ||  || — || November 19, 2003 || Socorro || LINEAR || PAL || align=right | 2.9 km || 
|-id=814 bgcolor=#E9E9E9
| 338814 ||  || — || November 19, 2003 || Kitt Peak || Spacewatch || — || align=right | 4.1 km || 
|-id=815 bgcolor=#E9E9E9
| 338815 ||  || — || November 20, 2003 || Kitt Peak || Spacewatch || — || align=right | 2.9 km || 
|-id=816 bgcolor=#E9E9E9
| 338816 ||  || — || November 18, 2003 || Palomar || NEAT || HOF || align=right | 3.4 km || 
|-id=817 bgcolor=#fefefe
| 338817 ||  || — || November 19, 2003 || Kitt Peak || Spacewatch || — || align=right data-sort-value="0.62" | 620 m || 
|-id=818 bgcolor=#E9E9E9
| 338818 ||  || — || November 19, 2003 || Kitt Peak || Spacewatch || PAE || align=right | 3.2 km || 
|-id=819 bgcolor=#E9E9E9
| 338819 ||  || — || November 19, 2003 || Kitt Peak || Spacewatch || — || align=right | 3.4 km || 
|-id=820 bgcolor=#E9E9E9
| 338820 ||  || — || November 20, 2003 || Socorro || LINEAR || — || align=right | 4.0 km || 
|-id=821 bgcolor=#E9E9E9
| 338821 ||  || — || November 20, 2003 || Socorro || LINEAR || DOR || align=right | 2.9 km || 
|-id=822 bgcolor=#E9E9E9
| 338822 ||  || — || November 19, 2003 || Kitt Peak || Spacewatch || — || align=right | 2.0 km || 
|-id=823 bgcolor=#E9E9E9
| 338823 ||  || — || November 20, 2003 || Socorro || LINEAR || GEF || align=right | 1.8 km || 
|-id=824 bgcolor=#E9E9E9
| 338824 ||  || — || November 19, 2003 || Palomar || NEAT || JUN || align=right | 1.3 km || 
|-id=825 bgcolor=#E9E9E9
| 338825 ||  || — || November 19, 2003 || Palomar || NEAT || GEF || align=right | 1.7 km || 
|-id=826 bgcolor=#E9E9E9
| 338826 ||  || — || November 21, 2003 || Socorro || LINEAR || — || align=right | 3.2 km || 
|-id=827 bgcolor=#E9E9E9
| 338827 ||  || — || November 16, 2003 || Kitt Peak || Spacewatch || AGN || align=right | 1.4 km || 
|-id=828 bgcolor=#E9E9E9
| 338828 ||  || — || November 19, 2003 || Anderson Mesa || LONEOS || — || align=right | 4.6 km || 
|-id=829 bgcolor=#E9E9E9
| 338829 ||  || — || November 20, 2003 || Socorro || LINEAR || — || align=right | 2.5 km || 
|-id=830 bgcolor=#E9E9E9
| 338830 ||  || — || November 22, 2003 || Kitt Peak || Spacewatch || — || align=right | 2.6 km || 
|-id=831 bgcolor=#E9E9E9
| 338831 ||  || — || November 23, 2003 || Kitt Peak || Spacewatch || — || align=right | 2.1 km || 
|-id=832 bgcolor=#E9E9E9
| 338832 ||  || — || November 23, 2003 || Kitt Peak || Spacewatch || — || align=right | 2.1 km || 
|-id=833 bgcolor=#E9E9E9
| 338833 ||  || — || November 20, 2003 || Socorro || LINEAR || NEM || align=right | 2.9 km || 
|-id=834 bgcolor=#E9E9E9
| 338834 ||  || — || November 20, 2003 || Kitt Peak || Spacewatch || DOR || align=right | 3.1 km || 
|-id=835 bgcolor=#d6d6d6
| 338835 ||  || — || November 20, 2003 || Socorro || LINEAR || — || align=right | 3.9 km || 
|-id=836 bgcolor=#E9E9E9
| 338836 ||  || — || November 23, 2003 || Socorro || LINEAR || AGN || align=right | 1.6 km || 
|-id=837 bgcolor=#E9E9E9
| 338837 ||  || — || November 24, 2003 || Palomar || NEAT || — || align=right | 2.0 km || 
|-id=838 bgcolor=#E9E9E9
| 338838 ||  || — || November 26, 2003 || Kitt Peak || Spacewatch || — || align=right | 1.9 km || 
|-id=839 bgcolor=#E9E9E9
| 338839 ||  || — || November 25, 2003 || Kingsnake || J. V. McClusky || — || align=right | 4.4 km || 
|-id=840 bgcolor=#E9E9E9
| 338840 ||  || — || November 30, 2003 || Kitt Peak || Spacewatch || — || align=right | 2.3 km || 
|-id=841 bgcolor=#E9E9E9
| 338841 ||  || — || November 30, 2003 || Kitt Peak || Spacewatch || AGN || align=right | 1.4 km || 
|-id=842 bgcolor=#E9E9E9
| 338842 ||  || — || December 1, 2003 || Kitt Peak || Spacewatch || DOR || align=right | 3.9 km || 
|-id=843 bgcolor=#E9E9E9
| 338843 ||  || — || December 1, 2003 || Socorro || LINEAR || DOR || align=right | 3.6 km || 
|-id=844 bgcolor=#E9E9E9
| 338844 ||  || — || December 3, 2003 || Socorro || LINEAR || GAL || align=right | 2.5 km || 
|-id=845 bgcolor=#E9E9E9
| 338845 ||  || — || December 3, 2003 || Socorro || LINEAR || — || align=right | 3.1 km || 
|-id=846 bgcolor=#E9E9E9
| 338846 ||  || — || December 4, 2003 || Socorro || LINEAR || JUN || align=right | 1.7 km || 
|-id=847 bgcolor=#FA8072
| 338847 ||  || — || December 14, 2003 || Palomar || NEAT || — || align=right | 1.2 km || 
|-id=848 bgcolor=#d6d6d6
| 338848 ||  || — || December 1, 2003 || Socorro || LINEAR || — || align=right | 3.4 km || 
|-id=849 bgcolor=#E9E9E9
| 338849 ||  || — || December 1, 2003 || Kitt Peak || Spacewatch || WIT || align=right | 1.4 km || 
|-id=850 bgcolor=#d6d6d6
| 338850 ||  || — || December 1, 2003 || Kitt Peak || Spacewatch || CHA || align=right | 1.9 km || 
|-id=851 bgcolor=#E9E9E9
| 338851 ||  || — || December 16, 2003 || Socorro || LINEAR || — || align=right | 4.1 km || 
|-id=852 bgcolor=#E9E9E9
| 338852 ||  || — || December 17, 2003 || Socorro || LINEAR || — || align=right | 3.9 km || 
|-id=853 bgcolor=#fefefe
| 338853 ||  || — || December 17, 2003 || Kitt Peak || Spacewatch || — || align=right | 1.0 km || 
|-id=854 bgcolor=#E9E9E9
| 338854 ||  || — || December 18, 2003 || Socorro || LINEAR || — || align=right | 3.4 km || 
|-id=855 bgcolor=#E9E9E9
| 338855 ||  || — || December 17, 2003 || Socorro || LINEAR || — || align=right | 2.4 km || 
|-id=856 bgcolor=#E9E9E9
| 338856 ||  || — || December 18, 2003 || Socorro || LINEAR || — || align=right | 2.0 km || 
|-id=857 bgcolor=#E9E9E9
| 338857 ||  || — || December 18, 2003 || Kitt Peak || Spacewatch || MRX || align=right | 1.6 km || 
|-id=858 bgcolor=#C2FFFF
| 338858 ||  || — || December 19, 2003 || Kitt Peak || Spacewatch || L5 || align=right | 14 km || 
|-id=859 bgcolor=#E9E9E9
| 338859 ||  || — || December 19, 2003 || Socorro || LINEAR || — || align=right | 2.8 km || 
|-id=860 bgcolor=#E9E9E9
| 338860 ||  || — || December 22, 2003 || Socorro || LINEAR || — || align=right | 3.2 km || 
|-id=861 bgcolor=#d6d6d6
| 338861 ||  || — || December 22, 2003 || Socorro || LINEAR || — || align=right | 4.4 km || 
|-id=862 bgcolor=#E9E9E9
| 338862 ||  || — || December 28, 2003 || Socorro || LINEAR || — || align=right | 1.9 km || 
|-id=863 bgcolor=#E9E9E9
| 338863 ||  || — || December 27, 2003 || Socorro || LINEAR || — || align=right | 2.5 km || 
|-id=864 bgcolor=#d6d6d6
| 338864 ||  || — || December 27, 2003 || Kitt Peak || Spacewatch || — || align=right | 2.7 km || 
|-id=865 bgcolor=#E9E9E9
| 338865 ||  || — || December 28, 2003 || Socorro || LINEAR || — || align=right | 2.5 km || 
|-id=866 bgcolor=#E9E9E9
| 338866 ||  || — || December 17, 2003 || Anderson Mesa || LONEOS || — || align=right | 3.2 km || 
|-id=867 bgcolor=#d6d6d6
| 338867 ||  || — || December 19, 2003 || Kitt Peak || Spacewatch || — || align=right | 4.0 km || 
|-id=868 bgcolor=#E9E9E9
| 338868 ||  || — || January 14, 2004 || Palomar || NEAT || — || align=right | 2.5 km || 
|-id=869 bgcolor=#fefefe
| 338869 ||  || — || January 13, 2004 || Palomar || NEAT || — || align=right data-sort-value="0.79" | 790 m || 
|-id=870 bgcolor=#d6d6d6
| 338870 ||  || — || January 15, 2004 || Kitt Peak || Spacewatch || — || align=right | 3.3 km || 
|-id=871 bgcolor=#fefefe
| 338871 ||  || — || January 16, 2004 || Palomar || NEAT || — || align=right data-sort-value="0.99" | 990 m || 
|-id=872 bgcolor=#fefefe
| 338872 ||  || — || January 16, 2004 || Palomar || NEAT || FLO || align=right data-sort-value="0.80" | 800 m || 
|-id=873 bgcolor=#d6d6d6
| 338873 ||  || — || January 17, 2004 || Palomar || NEAT || — || align=right | 3.0 km || 
|-id=874 bgcolor=#E9E9E9
| 338874 ||  || — || January 18, 2004 || Palomar || NEAT || — || align=right | 4.1 km || 
|-id=875 bgcolor=#fefefe
| 338875 ||  || — || January 21, 2004 || Socorro || LINEAR || FLO || align=right data-sort-value="0.74" | 740 m || 
|-id=876 bgcolor=#fefefe
| 338876 ||  || — || January 23, 2004 || Socorro || LINEAR || FLO || align=right data-sort-value="0.79" | 790 m || 
|-id=877 bgcolor=#fefefe
| 338877 ||  || — || January 23, 2004 || Socorro || LINEAR || — || align=right | 1.00 km || 
|-id=878 bgcolor=#d6d6d6
| 338878 ||  || — || January 22, 2004 || Socorro || LINEAR || — || align=right | 3.7 km || 
|-id=879 bgcolor=#d6d6d6
| 338879 ||  || — || January 23, 2004 || Socorro || LINEAR || EOS || align=right | 2.7 km || 
|-id=880 bgcolor=#E9E9E9
| 338880 ||  || — || January 24, 2004 || Socorro || LINEAR || AEO || align=right | 1.5 km || 
|-id=881 bgcolor=#fefefe
| 338881 ||  || — || January 27, 2004 || Kitt Peak || Spacewatch || V || align=right data-sort-value="0.96" | 960 m || 
|-id=882 bgcolor=#fefefe
| 338882 ||  || — || January 28, 2004 || Kitt Peak || Spacewatch || FLO || align=right data-sort-value="0.61" | 610 m || 
|-id=883 bgcolor=#fefefe
| 338883 ||  || — || January 30, 2004 || Kitt Peak || Spacewatch || — || align=right | 1.0 km || 
|-id=884 bgcolor=#d6d6d6
| 338884 ||  || — || January 29, 2004 || Socorro || LINEAR || IMH || align=right | 3.8 km || 
|-id=885 bgcolor=#d6d6d6
| 338885 ||  || — || January 19, 2004 || Kitt Peak || Spacewatch || — || align=right | 2.5 km || 
|-id=886 bgcolor=#C2FFFF
| 338886 ||  || — || January 19, 2004 || Kitt Peak || Spacewatch || L5 || align=right | 9.9 km || 
|-id=887 bgcolor=#d6d6d6
| 338887 ||  || — || January 19, 2004 || Kitt Peak || Spacewatch || — || align=right | 2.2 km || 
|-id=888 bgcolor=#fefefe
| 338888 ||  || — || January 17, 2004 || Palomar || NEAT || — || align=right | 1.7 km || 
|-id=889 bgcolor=#d6d6d6
| 338889 ||  || — || January 18, 2004 || Kitt Peak || Spacewatch || EOS || align=right | 2.6 km || 
|-id=890 bgcolor=#d6d6d6
| 338890 ||  || — || February 10, 2004 || Palomar || NEAT || — || align=right | 4.9 km || 
|-id=891 bgcolor=#d6d6d6
| 338891 ||  || — || February 10, 2004 || Catalina || CSS || — || align=right | 4.6 km || 
|-id=892 bgcolor=#d6d6d6
| 338892 ||  || — || February 11, 2004 || Kitt Peak || Spacewatch || — || align=right | 2.6 km || 
|-id=893 bgcolor=#d6d6d6
| 338893 ||  || — || February 11, 2004 || Palomar || NEAT || — || align=right | 2.9 km || 
|-id=894 bgcolor=#d6d6d6
| 338894 ||  || — || February 12, 2004 || Kitt Peak || Spacewatch || KOR || align=right | 1.3 km || 
|-id=895 bgcolor=#fefefe
| 338895 ||  || — || February 14, 2004 || Haleakala || NEAT || FLO || align=right data-sort-value="0.84" | 840 m || 
|-id=896 bgcolor=#d6d6d6
| 338896 ||  || — || February 13, 2004 || Palomar || NEAT || EUP || align=right | 4.0 km || 
|-id=897 bgcolor=#d6d6d6
| 338897 ||  || — || February 11, 2004 || Palomar || NEAT || LIX || align=right | 4.5 km || 
|-id=898 bgcolor=#d6d6d6
| 338898 ||  || — || February 11, 2004 || Palomar || NEAT || 628 || align=right | 2.3 km || 
|-id=899 bgcolor=#d6d6d6
| 338899 ||  || — || February 15, 2004 || Socorro || LINEAR || — || align=right | 4.6 km || 
|-id=900 bgcolor=#d6d6d6
| 338900 ||  || — || February 11, 2004 || Kitt Peak || Spacewatch || — || align=right | 3.0 km || 
|}

338901–339000 

|-bgcolor=#fefefe
| 338901 ||  || — || February 15, 2004 || Catalina || CSS || — || align=right | 2.2 km || 
|-id=902 bgcolor=#d6d6d6
| 338902 ||  || — || February 15, 2004 || Catalina || CSS || EUP || align=right | 4.8 km || 
|-id=903 bgcolor=#d6d6d6
| 338903 ||  || — || February 14, 2004 || Kitt Peak || Spacewatch || EOS || align=right | 2.4 km || 
|-id=904 bgcolor=#fefefe
| 338904 ||  || — || February 16, 2004 || Socorro || LINEAR || PHO || align=right | 1.2 km || 
|-id=905 bgcolor=#d6d6d6
| 338905 ||  || — || February 17, 2004 || Kitt Peak || Spacewatch || — || align=right | 4.5 km || 
|-id=906 bgcolor=#d6d6d6
| 338906 ||  || — || February 16, 2004 || Kitt Peak || Spacewatch || — || align=right | 3.8 km || 
|-id=907 bgcolor=#d6d6d6
| 338907 ||  || — || February 16, 2004 || Kitt Peak || Spacewatch || EOS || align=right | 2.4 km || 
|-id=908 bgcolor=#d6d6d6
| 338908 ||  || — || February 18, 2004 || Socorro || LINEAR || — || align=right | 4.0 km || 
|-id=909 bgcolor=#d6d6d6
| 338909 ||  || — || February 19, 2004 || Socorro || LINEAR || — || align=right | 3.4 km || 
|-id=910 bgcolor=#fefefe
| 338910 ||  || — || February 22, 2004 || Kitt Peak || Spacewatch || — || align=right data-sort-value="0.88" | 880 m || 
|-id=911 bgcolor=#d6d6d6
| 338911 ||  || — || February 17, 2004 || Haleakala || NEAT || EOS || align=right | 2.8 km || 
|-id=912 bgcolor=#fefefe
| 338912 ||  || — || February 22, 2004 || Kitt Peak || Spacewatch || — || align=right data-sort-value="0.90" | 900 m || 
|-id=913 bgcolor=#fefefe
| 338913 ||  || — || February 22, 2004 || Kitt Peak || Spacewatch || — || align=right data-sort-value="0.72" | 720 m || 
|-id=914 bgcolor=#d6d6d6
| 338914 ||  || — || February 22, 2004 || Kitt Peak || Spacewatch || — || align=right | 3.1 km || 
|-id=915 bgcolor=#d6d6d6
| 338915 ||  || — || February 26, 2004 || Kitt Peak || M. W. Buie || — || align=right | 3.6 km || 
|-id=916 bgcolor=#FA8072
| 338916 ||  || — || March 14, 2004 || Socorro || LINEAR || H || align=right data-sort-value="0.91" | 910 m || 
|-id=917 bgcolor=#fefefe
| 338917 ||  || — || March 13, 2004 || Palomar || NEAT || FLO || align=right | 1.4 km || 
|-id=918 bgcolor=#d6d6d6
| 338918 ||  || — || March 10, 2004 || Palomar || NEAT || — || align=right | 4.0 km || 
|-id=919 bgcolor=#d6d6d6
| 338919 ||  || — || March 11, 2004 || Palomar || NEAT || — || align=right | 3.3 km || 
|-id=920 bgcolor=#fefefe
| 338920 ||  || — || March 13, 2004 || Palomar || NEAT || — || align=right data-sort-value="0.95" | 950 m || 
|-id=921 bgcolor=#fefefe
| 338921 ||  || — || March 11, 2004 || Palomar || NEAT || FLO || align=right data-sort-value="0.78" | 780 m || 
|-id=922 bgcolor=#fefefe
| 338922 ||  || — || March 11, 2004 || Palomar || NEAT || V || align=right data-sort-value="0.91" | 910 m || 
|-id=923 bgcolor=#d6d6d6
| 338923 ||  || — || March 11, 2004 || Palomar || NEAT || — || align=right | 3.5 km || 
|-id=924 bgcolor=#d6d6d6
| 338924 ||  || — || March 14, 2004 || Kitt Peak || Spacewatch || EOS || align=right | 2.6 km || 
|-id=925 bgcolor=#d6d6d6
| 338925 ||  || — || March 15, 2004 || Kitt Peak || Spacewatch || THM || align=right | 2.7 km || 
|-id=926 bgcolor=#fefefe
| 338926 ||  || — || March 12, 2004 || Palomar || NEAT || FLO || align=right | 1.1 km || 
|-id=927 bgcolor=#fefefe
| 338927 ||  || — || March 13, 2004 || Palomar || NEAT || FLO || align=right data-sort-value="0.97" | 970 m || 
|-id=928 bgcolor=#fefefe
| 338928 ||  || — || March 15, 2004 || Kitt Peak || Spacewatch || — || align=right | 1.1 km || 
|-id=929 bgcolor=#d6d6d6
| 338929 ||  || — || March 15, 2004 || Kitt Peak || Spacewatch || — || align=right | 5.3 km || 
|-id=930 bgcolor=#fefefe
| 338930 ||  || — || March 15, 2004 || Catalina || CSS || — || align=right | 1.1 km || 
|-id=931 bgcolor=#d6d6d6
| 338931 ||  || — || March 15, 2004 || Socorro || LINEAR || — || align=right | 4.7 km || 
|-id=932 bgcolor=#fefefe
| 338932 ||  || — || March 15, 2004 || Catalina || CSS || — || align=right | 1.2 km || 
|-id=933 bgcolor=#d6d6d6
| 338933 ||  || — || March 15, 2004 || Kitt Peak || Spacewatch || — || align=right | 3.4 km || 
|-id=934 bgcolor=#fefefe
| 338934 ||  || — || March 15, 2004 || Catalina || CSS || — || align=right data-sort-value="0.89" | 890 m || 
|-id=935 bgcolor=#d6d6d6
| 338935 ||  || — || March 15, 2004 || Socorro || LINEAR || EOS || align=right | 2.7 km || 
|-id=936 bgcolor=#d6d6d6
| 338936 ||  || — || March 15, 2004 || Socorro || LINEAR || — || align=right | 2.9 km || 
|-id=937 bgcolor=#fefefe
| 338937 ||  || — || March 15, 2004 || Socorro || LINEAR || — || align=right data-sort-value="0.94" | 940 m || 
|-id=938 bgcolor=#d6d6d6
| 338938 ||  || — || March 15, 2004 || Socorro || LINEAR || — || align=right | 3.4 km || 
|-id=939 bgcolor=#fefefe
| 338939 ||  || — || March 11, 2004 || Palomar || NEAT || — || align=right data-sort-value="0.76" | 760 m || 
|-id=940 bgcolor=#d6d6d6
| 338940 ||  || — || March 12, 2004 || Palomar || NEAT || — || align=right | 4.8 km || 
|-id=941 bgcolor=#fefefe
| 338941 ||  || — || March 13, 2004 || Palomar || NEAT || FLO || align=right data-sort-value="0.72" | 720 m || 
|-id=942 bgcolor=#d6d6d6
| 338942 ||  || — || March 14, 2004 || Socorro || LINEAR || ALA || align=right | 5.0 km || 
|-id=943 bgcolor=#d6d6d6
| 338943 ||  || — || March 14, 2004 || Kitt Peak || Spacewatch || — || align=right | 3.1 km || 
|-id=944 bgcolor=#d6d6d6
| 338944 ||  || — || March 14, 2004 || Palomar || NEAT || — || align=right | 6.0 km || 
|-id=945 bgcolor=#d6d6d6
| 338945 ||  || — || March 15, 2004 || Socorro || LINEAR || — || align=right | 3.0 km || 
|-id=946 bgcolor=#d6d6d6
| 338946 ||  || — || March 15, 2004 || Kitt Peak || Spacewatch || — || align=right | 2.9 km || 
|-id=947 bgcolor=#fefefe
| 338947 ||  || — || March 13, 2004 || Palomar || NEAT || — || align=right | 1.1 km || 
|-id=948 bgcolor=#d6d6d6
| 338948 ||  || — || March 14, 2004 || Kitt Peak || Spacewatch || TIR || align=right | 3.6 km || 
|-id=949 bgcolor=#d6d6d6
| 338949 ||  || — || March 15, 2004 || Kitt Peak || Spacewatch || — || align=right | 2.9 km || 
|-id=950 bgcolor=#d6d6d6
| 338950 ||  || — || March 15, 2004 || Kitt Peak || Spacewatch || — || align=right | 4.6 km || 
|-id=951 bgcolor=#d6d6d6
| 338951 ||  || — || March 15, 2004 || Socorro || LINEAR || TIR || align=right | 4.5 km || 
|-id=952 bgcolor=#d6d6d6
| 338952 ||  || — || March 14, 2004 || Kitt Peak || Spacewatch || — || align=right | 2.7 km || 
|-id=953 bgcolor=#d6d6d6
| 338953 ||  || — || March 15, 2004 || Kitt Peak || Spacewatch || EOS || align=right | 2.7 km || 
|-id=954 bgcolor=#d6d6d6
| 338954 ||  || — || March 15, 2004 || Kitt Peak || Spacewatch || — || align=right | 2.2 km || 
|-id=955 bgcolor=#fefefe
| 338955 ||  || — || March 15, 2004 || Kitt Peak || Spacewatch || — || align=right data-sort-value="0.63" | 630 m || 
|-id=956 bgcolor=#fefefe
| 338956 ||  || — || March 15, 2004 || Kitt Peak || Spacewatch || — || align=right data-sort-value="0.84" | 840 m || 
|-id=957 bgcolor=#d6d6d6
| 338957 ||  || — || March 15, 2004 || Kitt Peak || Spacewatch || VER || align=right | 3.2 km || 
|-id=958 bgcolor=#d6d6d6
| 338958 ||  || — || July 26, 1995 || Kitt Peak || Spacewatch || URS || align=right | 3.4 km || 
|-id=959 bgcolor=#d6d6d6
| 338959 ||  || — || March 16, 2004 || Kitt Peak || Spacewatch || — || align=right | 2.6 km || 
|-id=960 bgcolor=#fefefe
| 338960 ||  || — || March 15, 2004 || Kitt Peak || Spacewatch || ERI || align=right | 1.9 km || 
|-id=961 bgcolor=#d6d6d6
| 338961 ||  || — || March 16, 2004 || Socorro || LINEAR || — || align=right | 3.4 km || 
|-id=962 bgcolor=#d6d6d6
| 338962 ||  || — || March 17, 2004 || Kitt Peak || Spacewatch || EOS || align=right | 2.5 km || 
|-id=963 bgcolor=#fefefe
| 338963 ||  || — || March 17, 2004 || Socorro || LINEAR || V || align=right data-sort-value="0.95" | 950 m || 
|-id=964 bgcolor=#fefefe
| 338964 ||  || — || March 16, 2004 || Socorro || LINEAR || — || align=right | 1.0 km || 
|-id=965 bgcolor=#d6d6d6
| 338965 ||  || — || March 18, 2004 || Socorro || LINEAR || — || align=right | 6.8 km || 
|-id=966 bgcolor=#fefefe
| 338966 ||  || — || March 18, 2004 || Socorro || LINEAR || — || align=right | 1.2 km || 
|-id=967 bgcolor=#d6d6d6
| 338967 ||  || — || March 17, 2004 || Kitt Peak || Spacewatch || — || align=right | 3.4 km || 
|-id=968 bgcolor=#fefefe
| 338968 ||  || — || March 18, 2004 || Socorro || LINEAR || NYS || align=right data-sort-value="0.74" | 740 m || 
|-id=969 bgcolor=#d6d6d6
| 338969 ||  || — || March 17, 2004 || Kitt Peak || Spacewatch || — || align=right | 2.5 km || 
|-id=970 bgcolor=#d6d6d6
| 338970 ||  || — || March 18, 2004 || Socorro || LINEAR || — || align=right | 2.9 km || 
|-id=971 bgcolor=#d6d6d6
| 338971 ||  || — || March 16, 2004 || Kitt Peak || Spacewatch || EUP || align=right | 5.2 km || 
|-id=972 bgcolor=#d6d6d6
| 338972 ||  || — || March 19, 2004 || Socorro || LINEAR || — || align=right | 4.5 km || 
|-id=973 bgcolor=#d6d6d6
| 338973 ||  || — || March 17, 2004 || Kitt Peak || Spacewatch || — || align=right | 3.4 km || 
|-id=974 bgcolor=#fefefe
| 338974 ||  || — || March 18, 2004 || Socorro || LINEAR || — || align=right data-sort-value="0.73" | 730 m || 
|-id=975 bgcolor=#fefefe
| 338975 ||  || — || March 18, 2004 || Socorro || LINEAR || — || align=right | 1.1 km || 
|-id=976 bgcolor=#d6d6d6
| 338976 ||  || — || March 20, 2004 || Kitt Peak || Spacewatch || — || align=right | 3.0 km || 
|-id=977 bgcolor=#d6d6d6
| 338977 ||  || — || March 24, 2004 || Anderson Mesa || LONEOS || — || align=right | 3.1 km || 
|-id=978 bgcolor=#fefefe
| 338978 ||  || — || March 23, 2004 || Socorro || LINEAR || — || align=right data-sort-value="0.99" | 990 m || 
|-id=979 bgcolor=#d6d6d6
| 338979 ||  || — || March 23, 2004 || Kitt Peak || Spacewatch || — || align=right | 3.1 km || 
|-id=980 bgcolor=#d6d6d6
| 338980 ||  || — || March 26, 2004 || Kitt Peak || Spacewatch || — || align=right | 2.6 km || 
|-id=981 bgcolor=#fefefe
| 338981 ||  || — || March 26, 2004 || Kitt Peak || Spacewatch || V || align=right data-sort-value="0.79" | 790 m || 
|-id=982 bgcolor=#fefefe
| 338982 ||  || — || March 26, 2004 || Kitt Peak || Spacewatch || FLO || align=right data-sort-value="0.63" | 630 m || 
|-id=983 bgcolor=#fefefe
| 338983 ||  || — || March 27, 2004 || Socorro || LINEAR || — || align=right | 1.2 km || 
|-id=984 bgcolor=#d6d6d6
| 338984 ||  || — || March 27, 2004 || Socorro || LINEAR || HYG || align=right | 3.9 km || 
|-id=985 bgcolor=#d6d6d6
| 338985 ||  || — || March 22, 2004 || Anderson Mesa || LONEOS || — || align=right | 4.4 km || 
|-id=986 bgcolor=#fefefe
| 338986 ||  || — || March 27, 2004 || Socorro || LINEAR || NYS || align=right data-sort-value="0.67" | 670 m || 
|-id=987 bgcolor=#d6d6d6
| 338987 ||  || — || March 28, 2004 || Socorro || LINEAR || — || align=right | 5.7 km || 
|-id=988 bgcolor=#fefefe
| 338988 ||  || — || March 27, 2004 || Catalina || CSS || — || align=right | 1.0 km || 
|-id=989 bgcolor=#d6d6d6
| 338989 ||  || — || March 30, 2004 || Kitt Peak || Spacewatch || EOS || align=right | 4.6 km || 
|-id=990 bgcolor=#fefefe
| 338990 ||  || — || April 9, 2004 || Siding Spring || SSS || — || align=right data-sort-value="0.86" | 860 m || 
|-id=991 bgcolor=#d6d6d6
| 338991 ||  || — || April 9, 2004 || Siding Spring || SSS || — || align=right | 2.9 km || 
|-id=992 bgcolor=#fefefe
| 338992 ||  || — || April 11, 2004 || Palomar || NEAT || — || align=right | 1.2 km || 
|-id=993 bgcolor=#fefefe
| 338993 ||  || — || April 12, 2004 || Kitt Peak || Spacewatch || V || align=right data-sort-value="0.52" | 520 m || 
|-id=994 bgcolor=#d6d6d6
| 338994 ||  || — || April 9, 2004 || Siding Spring || SSS || — || align=right | 4.8 km || 
|-id=995 bgcolor=#fefefe
| 338995 ||  || — || April 9, 2004 || Palomar || NEAT || — || align=right | 2.5 km || 
|-id=996 bgcolor=#fefefe
| 338996 ||  || — || April 12, 2004 || Kitt Peak || Spacewatch || — || align=right | 1.1 km || 
|-id=997 bgcolor=#fefefe
| 338997 ||  || — || April 12, 2004 || Kitt Peak || Spacewatch || NYS || align=right data-sort-value="0.79" | 790 m || 
|-id=998 bgcolor=#fefefe
| 338998 ||  || — || April 13, 2004 || Palomar || NEAT || ERI || align=right | 2.1 km || 
|-id=999 bgcolor=#d6d6d6
| 338999 ||  || — || April 12, 2004 || Kitt Peak || Spacewatch || — || align=right | 3.1 km || 
|-id=000 bgcolor=#fefefe
| 339000 ||  || — || April 15, 2004 || Catalina || CSS || — || align=right | 1.0 km || 
|}

References

External links 
 Discovery Circumstances: Numbered Minor Planets (335001)–(340000) (IAU Minor Planet Center)

0338